

231001–231100 

|-bgcolor=#d6d6d6
| 231001 ||  || — || March 1, 2005 || Kitt Peak || Spacewatch || — || align=right | 5.3 km || 
|-id=002 bgcolor=#d6d6d6
| 231002 ||  || — || March 2, 2005 || Kitt Peak || Spacewatch || — || align=right | 4.0 km || 
|-id=003 bgcolor=#d6d6d6
| 231003 ||  || — || March 3, 2005 || Kitt Peak || Spacewatch || — || align=right | 3.6 km || 
|-id=004 bgcolor=#d6d6d6
| 231004 ||  || — || March 3, 2005 || Catalina || CSS || — || align=right | 7.0 km || 
|-id=005 bgcolor=#d6d6d6
| 231005 ||  || — || March 3, 2005 || Catalina || CSS || — || align=right | 3.4 km || 
|-id=006 bgcolor=#d6d6d6
| 231006 ||  || — || March 3, 2005 || Catalina || CSS || — || align=right | 5.0 km || 
|-id=007 bgcolor=#d6d6d6
| 231007 ||  || — || March 4, 2005 || Catalina || CSS || — || align=right | 2.5 km || 
|-id=008 bgcolor=#d6d6d6
| 231008 ||  || — || March 4, 2005 || Catalina || CSS || — || align=right | 3.5 km || 
|-id=009 bgcolor=#d6d6d6
| 231009 ||  || — || March 1, 2005 || Kitt Peak || Spacewatch || THM || align=right | 4.7 km || 
|-id=010 bgcolor=#d6d6d6
| 231010 ||  || — || March 1, 2005 || Kitt Peak || Spacewatch || — || align=right | 4.2 km || 
|-id=011 bgcolor=#d6d6d6
| 231011 ||  || — || March 3, 2005 || Kitt Peak || Spacewatch || — || align=right | 2.6 km || 
|-id=012 bgcolor=#fefefe
| 231012 ||  || — || March 4, 2005 || Catalina || CSS || — || align=right | 1.3 km || 
|-id=013 bgcolor=#d6d6d6
| 231013 ||  || — || March 4, 2005 || Socorro || LINEAR || THM || align=right | 2.9 km || 
|-id=014 bgcolor=#d6d6d6
| 231014 ||  || — || March 7, 2005 || Socorro || LINEAR || — || align=right | 6.3 km || 
|-id=015 bgcolor=#d6d6d6
| 231015 ||  || — || March 2, 2005 || Catalina || CSS || — || align=right | 4.8 km || 
|-id=016 bgcolor=#d6d6d6
| 231016 ||  || — || March 2, 2005 || Catalina || CSS || EOS || align=right | 3.2 km || 
|-id=017 bgcolor=#d6d6d6
| 231017 ||  || — || March 3, 2005 || Catalina || CSS || LIX || align=right | 5.4 km || 
|-id=018 bgcolor=#d6d6d6
| 231018 ||  || — || March 4, 2005 || Socorro || LINEAR || EOS || align=right | 3.3 km || 
|-id=019 bgcolor=#d6d6d6
| 231019 ||  || — || March 4, 2005 || Socorro || LINEAR || — || align=right | 6.0 km || 
|-id=020 bgcolor=#d6d6d6
| 231020 ||  || — || March 3, 2005 || Catalina || CSS || VER || align=right | 3.6 km || 
|-id=021 bgcolor=#d6d6d6
| 231021 ||  || — || March 3, 2005 || Catalina || CSS || — || align=right | 3.9 km || 
|-id=022 bgcolor=#d6d6d6
| 231022 ||  || — || March 9, 2005 || Anderson Mesa || LONEOS || HYG || align=right | 4.7 km || 
|-id=023 bgcolor=#d6d6d6
| 231023 ||  || — || March 9, 2005 || Socorro || LINEAR || — || align=right | 4.8 km || 
|-id=024 bgcolor=#d6d6d6
| 231024 ||  || — || March 10, 2005 || Kitt Peak || Spacewatch || — || align=right | 7.0 km || 
|-id=025 bgcolor=#d6d6d6
| 231025 ||  || — || March 10, 2005 || Kitt Peak || Spacewatch || THM || align=right | 3.1 km || 
|-id=026 bgcolor=#d6d6d6
| 231026 ||  || — || March 11, 2005 || Mount Lemmon || Mount Lemmon Survey || — || align=right | 4.2 km || 
|-id=027 bgcolor=#d6d6d6
| 231027 ||  || — || March 11, 2005 || Anderson Mesa || LONEOS || — || align=right | 4.5 km || 
|-id=028 bgcolor=#d6d6d6
| 231028 ||  || — || March 8, 2005 || Anderson Mesa || LONEOS || — || align=right | 5.3 km || 
|-id=029 bgcolor=#d6d6d6
| 231029 ||  || — || March 12, 2005 || Socorro || LINEAR || EUP || align=right | 5.8 km || 
|-id=030 bgcolor=#d6d6d6
| 231030 ||  || — || March 12, 2005 || Kitt Peak || Spacewatch || THM || align=right | 3.7 km || 
|-id=031 bgcolor=#d6d6d6
| 231031 ||  || — || March 9, 2005 || Catalina || CSS || — || align=right | 5.1 km || 
|-id=032 bgcolor=#d6d6d6
| 231032 ||  || — || March 9, 2005 || Catalina || CSS || EOS || align=right | 3.6 km || 
|-id=033 bgcolor=#d6d6d6
| 231033 ||  || — || March 11, 2005 || Kitt Peak || Spacewatch || THM || align=right | 3.5 km || 
|-id=034 bgcolor=#d6d6d6
| 231034 ||  || — || March 10, 2005 || Siding Spring || SSS || — || align=right | 6.2 km || 
|-id=035 bgcolor=#d6d6d6
| 231035 ||  || — || March 11, 2005 || Mount Lemmon || Mount Lemmon Survey || HYG || align=right | 3.3 km || 
|-id=036 bgcolor=#d6d6d6
| 231036 ||  || — || March 13, 2005 || Kitt Peak || Spacewatch || HYG || align=right | 3.3 km || 
|-id=037 bgcolor=#d6d6d6
| 231037 ||  || — || March 8, 2005 || Kitt Peak || Spacewatch || HYG || align=right | 3.8 km || 
|-id=038 bgcolor=#d6d6d6
| 231038 ||  || — || March 9, 2005 || Socorro || LINEAR || TIR || align=right | 3.7 km || 
|-id=039 bgcolor=#d6d6d6
| 231039 ||  || — || March 10, 2005 || Catalina || CSS || — || align=right | 3.0 km || 
|-id=040 bgcolor=#d6d6d6
| 231040 Kakaras ||  ||  || March 10, 2005 || Moletai || K. Černis, J. Zdanavičius || — || align=right | 6.0 km || 
|-id=041 bgcolor=#d6d6d6
| 231041 ||  || — || March 10, 2005 || Catalina || CSS || — || align=right | 4.5 km || 
|-id=042 bgcolor=#d6d6d6
| 231042 ||  || — || March 9, 2005 || Kitt Peak || M. W. Buie || CHA || align=right | 2.8 km || 
|-id=043 bgcolor=#d6d6d6
| 231043 ||  || — || March 30, 2005 || Catalina || CSS || — || align=right | 3.7 km || 
|-id=044 bgcolor=#d6d6d6
| 231044 ||  || — || April 1, 2005 || Catalina || CSS || — || align=right | 4.9 km || 
|-id=045 bgcolor=#d6d6d6
| 231045 ||  || — || April 1, 2005 || Kitt Peak || Spacewatch || HYG || align=right | 5.4 km || 
|-id=046 bgcolor=#d6d6d6
| 231046 ||  || — || April 4, 2005 || Catalina || CSS || HYG || align=right | 4.4 km || 
|-id=047 bgcolor=#d6d6d6
| 231047 ||  || — || April 4, 2005 || Catalina || CSS || — || align=right | 3.8 km || 
|-id=048 bgcolor=#d6d6d6
| 231048 ||  || — || April 1, 2005 || Anderson Mesa || LONEOS || — || align=right | 2.8 km || 
|-id=049 bgcolor=#d6d6d6
| 231049 ||  || — || April 5, 2005 || Palomar || NEAT || — || align=right | 5.9 km || 
|-id=050 bgcolor=#d6d6d6
| 231050 ||  || — || April 5, 2005 || Mount Lemmon || Mount Lemmon Survey || HYG || align=right | 3.5 km || 
|-id=051 bgcolor=#d6d6d6
| 231051 ||  || — || April 8, 2005 || Lulin Observatory || Lulin Obs. || — || align=right | 5.2 km || 
|-id=052 bgcolor=#d6d6d6
| 231052 ||  || — || April 2, 2005 || Catalina || CSS || URS || align=right | 5.5 km || 
|-id=053 bgcolor=#fefefe
| 231053 ||  || — || April 11, 2005 || Kitt Peak || Spacewatch || H || align=right data-sort-value="0.81" | 810 m || 
|-id=054 bgcolor=#d6d6d6
| 231054 ||  || — || April 5, 2005 || Palomar || NEAT || — || align=right | 5.7 km || 
|-id=055 bgcolor=#d6d6d6
| 231055 ||  || — || April 9, 2005 || Kitt Peak || Spacewatch || — || align=right | 4.7 km || 
|-id=056 bgcolor=#fefefe
| 231056 ||  || — || May 3, 2005 || Kitt Peak || DLS || H || align=right data-sort-value="0.88" | 880 m || 
|-id=057 bgcolor=#E9E9E9
| 231057 ||  || — || May 12, 2005 || Catalina || CSS || — || align=right | 2.9 km || 
|-id=058 bgcolor=#d6d6d6
| 231058 ||  || — || June 10, 2005 || Kitt Peak || Spacewatch || — || align=right | 3.1 km || 
|-id=059 bgcolor=#fefefe
| 231059 ||  || — || July 5, 2005 || Junk Bond || D. Healy || V || align=right data-sort-value="0.86" | 860 m || 
|-id=060 bgcolor=#fefefe
| 231060 ||  || — || July 5, 2005 || Mount Lemmon || Mount Lemmon Survey || MAS || align=right data-sort-value="0.73" | 730 m || 
|-id=061 bgcolor=#fefefe
| 231061 ||  || — || July 2, 2005 || Catalina || CSS || — || align=right | 1.1 km || 
|-id=062 bgcolor=#fefefe
| 231062 ||  || — || July 28, 2005 || Palomar || NEAT || V || align=right data-sort-value="0.94" | 940 m || 
|-id=063 bgcolor=#fefefe
| 231063 ||  || — || July 31, 2005 || Palomar || NEAT || — || align=right data-sort-value="0.98" | 980 m || 
|-id=064 bgcolor=#fefefe
| 231064 ||  || — || July 31, 2005 || Palomar || NEAT || NYS || align=right data-sort-value="0.91" | 910 m || 
|-id=065 bgcolor=#fefefe
| 231065 ||  || — || July 30, 2005 || Palomar || NEAT || FLO || align=right data-sort-value="0.88" | 880 m || 
|-id=066 bgcolor=#fefefe
| 231066 ||  || — || July 31, 2005 || Palomar || NEAT || — || align=right | 1.3 km || 
|-id=067 bgcolor=#fefefe
| 231067 ||  || — || August 1, 2005 || Siding Spring || SSS || V || align=right data-sort-value="0.82" | 820 m || 
|-id=068 bgcolor=#fefefe
| 231068 ||  || — || August 4, 2005 || Palomar || NEAT || — || align=right data-sort-value="0.94" | 940 m || 
|-id=069 bgcolor=#fefefe
| 231069 ||  || — || August 25, 2005 || Palomar || NEAT || FLO || align=right | 1.1 km || 
|-id=070 bgcolor=#fefefe
| 231070 ||  || — || August 25, 2005 || Campo Imperatore || CINEOS || FLO || align=right data-sort-value="0.80" | 800 m || 
|-id=071 bgcolor=#fefefe
| 231071 ||  || — || August 27, 2005 || Kitt Peak || Spacewatch || NYS || align=right data-sort-value="0.94" | 940 m || 
|-id=072 bgcolor=#fefefe
| 231072 ||  || — || August 27, 2005 || Anderson Mesa || LONEOS || NYS || align=right | 1.0 km || 
|-id=073 bgcolor=#fefefe
| 231073 ||  || — || August 25, 2005 || Palomar || NEAT || FLO || align=right data-sort-value="0.97" | 970 m || 
|-id=074 bgcolor=#fefefe
| 231074 ||  || — || August 26, 2005 || Haleakala || NEAT || V || align=right | 1.2 km || 
|-id=075 bgcolor=#fefefe
| 231075 ||  || — || August 26, 2005 || Palomar || NEAT || FLO || align=right | 1.1 km || 
|-id=076 bgcolor=#fefefe
| 231076 ||  || — || August 26, 2005 || Palomar || NEAT || — || align=right | 1.4 km || 
|-id=077 bgcolor=#fefefe
| 231077 ||  || — || August 26, 2005 || Palomar || NEAT || — || align=right | 1.2 km || 
|-id=078 bgcolor=#fefefe
| 231078 ||  || — || August 27, 2005 || Anderson Mesa || LONEOS || — || align=right | 1.3 km || 
|-id=079 bgcolor=#fefefe
| 231079 ||  || — || August 29, 2005 || Socorro || LINEAR || — || align=right | 1.1 km || 
|-id=080 bgcolor=#fefefe
| 231080 ||  || — || August 28, 2005 || Anderson Mesa || LONEOS || — || align=right | 1.1 km || 
|-id=081 bgcolor=#fefefe
| 231081 ||  || — || August 29, 2005 || Anderson Mesa || LONEOS || — || align=right data-sort-value="0.90" | 900 m || 
|-id=082 bgcolor=#fefefe
| 231082 ||  || — || August 27, 2005 || Palomar || NEAT || — || align=right | 1.1 km || 
|-id=083 bgcolor=#fefefe
| 231083 ||  || — || August 27, 2005 || Palomar || NEAT || NYS || align=right data-sort-value="0.90" | 900 m || 
|-id=084 bgcolor=#E9E9E9
| 231084 ||  || — || August 31, 2005 || Palomar || NEAT || — || align=right | 1.9 km || 
|-id=085 bgcolor=#fefefe
| 231085 ||  || — || August 29, 2005 || Palomar || NEAT || — || align=right | 1.4 km || 
|-id=086 bgcolor=#fefefe
| 231086 ||  || — || August 31, 2005 || Palomar || NEAT || V || align=right data-sort-value="0.98" | 980 m || 
|-id=087 bgcolor=#fefefe
| 231087 ||  || — || August 28, 2005 || Kitt Peak || Spacewatch || — || align=right data-sort-value="0.72" | 720 m || 
|-id=088 bgcolor=#fefefe
| 231088 ||  || — || September 8, 2005 || Socorro || LINEAR || — || align=right data-sort-value="0.93" | 930 m || 
|-id=089 bgcolor=#fefefe
| 231089 ||  || — || September 10, 2005 || Anderson Mesa || LONEOS || — || align=right | 1.1 km || 
|-id=090 bgcolor=#fefefe
| 231090 ||  || — || September 10, 2005 || Anderson Mesa || LONEOS || FLO || align=right | 1.1 km || 
|-id=091 bgcolor=#fefefe
| 231091 ||  || — || September 1, 2005 || Kitt Peak || Spacewatch || MAS || align=right data-sort-value="0.67" | 670 m || 
|-id=092 bgcolor=#fefefe
| 231092 ||  || — || September 12, 2005 || Haleakala || NEAT || FLO || align=right data-sort-value="0.98" | 980 m || 
|-id=093 bgcolor=#fefefe
| 231093 ||  || — || September 12, 2005 || Haleakala || NEAT || — || align=right | 1.2 km || 
|-id=094 bgcolor=#fefefe
| 231094 ||  || — || September 26, 2005 || Catalina || CSS || FLO || align=right | 1.1 km || 
|-id=095 bgcolor=#fefefe
| 231095 ||  || — || September 23, 2005 || Kitt Peak || Spacewatch || — || align=right | 1.1 km || 
|-id=096 bgcolor=#fefefe
| 231096 ||  || — || September 23, 2005 || Catalina || CSS || — || align=right | 1.1 km || 
|-id=097 bgcolor=#fefefe
| 231097 ||  || — || September 25, 2005 || Catalina || CSS || — || align=right data-sort-value="0.99" | 990 m || 
|-id=098 bgcolor=#fefefe
| 231098 ||  || — || September 23, 2005 || Kitt Peak || Spacewatch || — || align=right data-sort-value="0.80" | 800 m || 
|-id=099 bgcolor=#fefefe
| 231099 ||  || — || September 23, 2005 || Kitt Peak || Spacewatch || — || align=right | 1.2 km || 
|-id=100 bgcolor=#fefefe
| 231100 ||  || — || September 24, 2005 || Kitt Peak || Spacewatch || EUT || align=right data-sort-value="0.74" | 740 m || 
|}

231101–231200 

|-bgcolor=#E9E9E9
| 231101 ||  || — || September 24, 2005 || Kitt Peak || Spacewatch || — || align=right | 2.1 km || 
|-id=102 bgcolor=#fefefe
| 231102 ||  || — || September 27, 2005 || Palomar || NEAT || — || align=right | 1.0 km || 
|-id=103 bgcolor=#fefefe
| 231103 ||  || — || September 28, 2005 || Socorro || LINEAR || — || align=right data-sort-value="0.98" | 980 m || 
|-id=104 bgcolor=#fefefe
| 231104 ||  || — || September 25, 2005 || Kitt Peak || Spacewatch || — || align=right | 1.4 km || 
|-id=105 bgcolor=#fefefe
| 231105 ||  || — || September 25, 2005 || Kitt Peak || Spacewatch || V || align=right | 1.1 km || 
|-id=106 bgcolor=#fefefe
| 231106 ||  || — || September 28, 2005 || Palomar || NEAT || NYS || align=right data-sort-value="0.74" | 740 m || 
|-id=107 bgcolor=#fefefe
| 231107 ||  || — || September 28, 2005 || Palomar || NEAT || FLO || align=right data-sort-value="0.97" | 970 m || 
|-id=108 bgcolor=#fefefe
| 231108 ||  || — || September 29, 2005 || Kitt Peak || Spacewatch || V || align=right data-sort-value="0.90" | 900 m || 
|-id=109 bgcolor=#fefefe
| 231109 ||  || — || September 29, 2005 || Mount Lemmon || Mount Lemmon Survey || NYS || align=right data-sort-value="0.91" | 910 m || 
|-id=110 bgcolor=#fefefe
| 231110 ||  || — || September 29, 2005 || Kitt Peak || Spacewatch || MAS || align=right data-sort-value="0.78" | 780 m || 
|-id=111 bgcolor=#fefefe
| 231111 ||  || — || September 25, 2005 || Kitt Peak || Spacewatch || — || align=right | 1.2 km || 
|-id=112 bgcolor=#fefefe
| 231112 ||  || — || September 25, 2005 || Kitt Peak || Spacewatch || — || align=right data-sort-value="0.81" | 810 m || 
|-id=113 bgcolor=#fefefe
| 231113 ||  || — || September 25, 2005 || Kitt Peak || Spacewatch || V || align=right data-sort-value="0.98" | 980 m || 
|-id=114 bgcolor=#fefefe
| 231114 ||  || — || September 26, 2005 || Kitt Peak || Spacewatch || — || align=right | 1.6 km || 
|-id=115 bgcolor=#fefefe
| 231115 ||  || — || September 27, 2005 || Kitt Peak || Spacewatch || NYS || align=right data-sort-value="0.79" | 790 m || 
|-id=116 bgcolor=#fefefe
| 231116 ||  || — || September 27, 2005 || Palomar || NEAT || V || align=right | 1.0 km || 
|-id=117 bgcolor=#fefefe
| 231117 ||  || — || September 29, 2005 || Anderson Mesa || LONEOS || FLO || align=right data-sort-value="0.95" | 950 m || 
|-id=118 bgcolor=#fefefe
| 231118 ||  || — || September 29, 2005 || Mount Lemmon || Mount Lemmon Survey || — || align=right | 1.1 km || 
|-id=119 bgcolor=#fefefe
| 231119 ||  || — || September 29, 2005 || Kitt Peak || Spacewatch || — || align=right | 1.3 km || 
|-id=120 bgcolor=#E9E9E9
| 231120 ||  || — || September 30, 2005 || Palomar || NEAT || MAR || align=right | 1.1 km || 
|-id=121 bgcolor=#fefefe
| 231121 ||  || — || September 30, 2005 || Mount Lemmon || Mount Lemmon Survey || — || align=right | 1.8 km || 
|-id=122 bgcolor=#fefefe
| 231122 ||  || — || September 30, 2005 || Catalina || CSS || — || align=right | 3.7 km || 
|-id=123 bgcolor=#fefefe
| 231123 ||  || — || September 30, 2005 || Palomar || NEAT || MAS || align=right data-sort-value="0.97" | 970 m || 
|-id=124 bgcolor=#fefefe
| 231124 ||  || — || September 30, 2005 || Mount Lemmon || Mount Lemmon Survey || MAS || align=right data-sort-value="0.88" | 880 m || 
|-id=125 bgcolor=#fefefe
| 231125 ||  || — || September 30, 2005 || Mount Lemmon || Mount Lemmon Survey || NYS || align=right data-sort-value="0.84" | 840 m || 
|-id=126 bgcolor=#fefefe
| 231126 ||  || — || September 29, 2005 || Kitt Peak || Spacewatch || — || align=right data-sort-value="0.94" | 940 m || 
|-id=127 bgcolor=#fefefe
| 231127 ||  || — || September 30, 2005 || Mount Lemmon || Mount Lemmon Survey || — || align=right data-sort-value="0.76" | 760 m || 
|-id=128 bgcolor=#fefefe
| 231128 ||  || — || September 24, 2005 || Palomar || NEAT || — || align=right | 1.0 km || 
|-id=129 bgcolor=#fefefe
| 231129 ||  || — || September 25, 2005 || Catalina || CSS || — || align=right | 1.1 km || 
|-id=130 bgcolor=#fefefe
| 231130 ||  || — || September 24, 2005 || Kitt Peak || Spacewatch || — || align=right | 2.3 km || 
|-id=131 bgcolor=#fefefe
| 231131 ||  || — || September 24, 2005 || Kitt Peak || Spacewatch || — || align=right | 1.1 km || 
|-id=132 bgcolor=#fefefe
| 231132 ||  || — || October 1, 2005 || Goodricke-Pigott || R. A. Tucker || — || align=right | 1.0 km || 
|-id=133 bgcolor=#fefefe
| 231133 ||  || — || October 1, 2005 || Mount Lemmon || Mount Lemmon Survey || — || align=right | 1.5 km || 
|-id=134 bgcolor=#FFC2E0
| 231134 ||  || — || October 5, 2005 || Mauna Kea || D. J. Tholen || APO +1km || align=right | 1.3 km || 
|-id=135 bgcolor=#fefefe
| 231135 ||  || — || October 6, 2005 || Catalina || CSS || — || align=right data-sort-value="0.86" | 860 m || 
|-id=136 bgcolor=#fefefe
| 231136 ||  || — || October 3, 2005 || Catalina || CSS || FLO || align=right data-sort-value="0.97" | 970 m || 
|-id=137 bgcolor=#fefefe
| 231137 ||  || — || October 6, 2005 || Catalina || CSS || NYS || align=right data-sort-value="0.80" | 800 m || 
|-id=138 bgcolor=#fefefe
| 231138 ||  || — || October 8, 2005 || Socorro || LINEAR || FLO || align=right | 1.0 km || 
|-id=139 bgcolor=#fefefe
| 231139 ||  || — || October 7, 2005 || Kitt Peak || Spacewatch || NYS || align=right data-sort-value="0.71" | 710 m || 
|-id=140 bgcolor=#E9E9E9
| 231140 ||  || — || October 5, 2005 || Kitt Peak || Spacewatch || — || align=right | 1.9 km || 
|-id=141 bgcolor=#fefefe
| 231141 ||  || — || October 8, 2005 || Kitt Peak || Spacewatch || — || align=right data-sort-value="0.87" | 870 m || 
|-id=142 bgcolor=#fefefe
| 231142 ||  || — || October 8, 2005 || Kitt Peak || Spacewatch || — || align=right data-sort-value="0.94" | 940 m || 
|-id=143 bgcolor=#fefefe
| 231143 ||  || — || October 9, 2005 || Kitt Peak || Spacewatch || FLO || align=right | 1.0 km || 
|-id=144 bgcolor=#fefefe
| 231144 ||  || — || October 24, 2005 || Goodricke-Pigott || R. A. Tucker || FLO || align=right | 1.00 km || 
|-id=145 bgcolor=#fefefe
| 231145 ||  || — || October 24, 2005 || Goodricke-Pigott || R. A. Tucker || MAS || align=right | 1.0 km || 
|-id=146 bgcolor=#fefefe
| 231146 ||  || — || October 22, 2005 || Kitt Peak || Spacewatch || NYS || align=right | 1.0 km || 
|-id=147 bgcolor=#fefefe
| 231147 ||  || — || October 22, 2005 || Kitt Peak || Spacewatch || MAS || align=right data-sort-value="0.73" | 730 m || 
|-id=148 bgcolor=#fefefe
| 231148 ||  || — || October 22, 2005 || Kitt Peak || Spacewatch || FLO || align=right data-sort-value="0.85" | 850 m || 
|-id=149 bgcolor=#fefefe
| 231149 ||  || — || October 22, 2005 || Kitt Peak || Spacewatch || — || align=right | 1.3 km || 
|-id=150 bgcolor=#fefefe
| 231150 ||  || — || October 23, 2005 || Catalina || CSS || — || align=right | 1.1 km || 
|-id=151 bgcolor=#fefefe
| 231151 ||  || — || October 27, 2005 || Cordell-Lorenz || D. T. Durig || NYS || align=right | 1.0 km || 
|-id=152 bgcolor=#fefefe
| 231152 ||  || — || October 22, 2005 || Kitt Peak || Spacewatch || — || align=right | 1.00 km || 
|-id=153 bgcolor=#fefefe
| 231153 ||  || — || October 22, 2005 || Kitt Peak || Spacewatch || V || align=right data-sort-value="0.86" | 860 m || 
|-id=154 bgcolor=#fefefe
| 231154 ||  || — || October 22, 2005 || Kitt Peak || Spacewatch || CLA || align=right | 2.4 km || 
|-id=155 bgcolor=#E9E9E9
| 231155 ||  || — || October 23, 2005 || Catalina || CSS || — || align=right | 2.0 km || 
|-id=156 bgcolor=#fefefe
| 231156 ||  || — || October 25, 2005 || Catalina || CSS || FLO || align=right data-sort-value="0.98" | 980 m || 
|-id=157 bgcolor=#E9E9E9
| 231157 ||  || — || October 25, 2005 || Mount Lemmon || Mount Lemmon Survey || — || align=right data-sort-value="0.91" | 910 m || 
|-id=158 bgcolor=#E9E9E9
| 231158 ||  || — || October 22, 2005 || Palomar || NEAT || — || align=right | 1.7 km || 
|-id=159 bgcolor=#fefefe
| 231159 ||  || — || October 22, 2005 || Palomar || NEAT || V || align=right | 1.1 km || 
|-id=160 bgcolor=#fefefe
| 231160 ||  || — || October 23, 2005 || Palomar || NEAT || FLO || align=right | 1.4 km || 
|-id=161 bgcolor=#fefefe
| 231161 ||  || — || October 23, 2005 || Palomar || NEAT || NYS || align=right | 1.0 km || 
|-id=162 bgcolor=#fefefe
| 231162 ||  || — || October 23, 2005 || Palomar || NEAT || NYS || align=right data-sort-value="0.86" | 860 m || 
|-id=163 bgcolor=#fefefe
| 231163 ||  || — || October 24, 2005 || Palomar || NEAT || — || align=right | 1.8 km || 
|-id=164 bgcolor=#fefefe
| 231164 ||  || — || October 25, 2005 || Catalina || CSS || NYS || align=right data-sort-value="0.94" | 940 m || 
|-id=165 bgcolor=#fefefe
| 231165 ||  || — || October 25, 2005 || Catalina || CSS || — || align=right | 1.4 km || 
|-id=166 bgcolor=#fefefe
| 231166 ||  || — || October 22, 2005 || Kitt Peak || Spacewatch || ERI || align=right | 2.6 km || 
|-id=167 bgcolor=#fefefe
| 231167 ||  || — || October 22, 2005 || Kitt Peak || Spacewatch || NYS || align=right data-sort-value="0.96" | 960 m || 
|-id=168 bgcolor=#fefefe
| 231168 ||  || — || October 22, 2005 || Palomar || NEAT || — || align=right | 1.2 km || 
|-id=169 bgcolor=#fefefe
| 231169 ||  || — || October 22, 2005 || Kitt Peak || Spacewatch || NYS || align=right data-sort-value="0.71" | 710 m || 
|-id=170 bgcolor=#E9E9E9
| 231170 ||  || — || October 24, 2005 || Kitt Peak || Spacewatch || — || align=right | 1.6 km || 
|-id=171 bgcolor=#fefefe
| 231171 ||  || — || October 25, 2005 || Mount Lemmon || Mount Lemmon Survey || MAS || align=right data-sort-value="0.80" | 800 m || 
|-id=172 bgcolor=#fefefe
| 231172 ||  || — || October 26, 2005 || Kitt Peak || Spacewatch || — || align=right data-sort-value="0.75" | 750 m || 
|-id=173 bgcolor=#E9E9E9
| 231173 ||  || — || October 26, 2005 || Kitt Peak || Spacewatch || — || align=right | 2.1 km || 
|-id=174 bgcolor=#fefefe
| 231174 ||  || — || October 26, 2005 || Kitt Peak || Spacewatch || NYS || align=right data-sort-value="0.80" | 800 m || 
|-id=175 bgcolor=#fefefe
| 231175 ||  || — || October 22, 2005 || Catalina || CSS || NYS || align=right data-sort-value="0.81" | 810 m || 
|-id=176 bgcolor=#fefefe
| 231176 ||  || — || October 24, 2005 || Kitt Peak || Spacewatch || — || align=right data-sort-value="0.93" | 930 m || 
|-id=177 bgcolor=#fefefe
| 231177 ||  || — || October 22, 2005 || Kitt Peak || Spacewatch || MAS || align=right data-sort-value="0.87" | 870 m || 
|-id=178 bgcolor=#fefefe
| 231178 ||  || — || October 27, 2005 || Kitt Peak || Spacewatch || MAS || align=right data-sort-value="0.80" | 800 m || 
|-id=179 bgcolor=#fefefe
| 231179 ||  || — || October 27, 2005 || Palomar || NEAT || FLO || align=right data-sort-value="0.91" | 910 m || 
|-id=180 bgcolor=#fefefe
| 231180 ||  || — || October 25, 2005 || Kitt Peak || Spacewatch || NYS || align=right data-sort-value="0.96" | 960 m || 
|-id=181 bgcolor=#E9E9E9
| 231181 ||  || — || October 25, 2005 || Kitt Peak || Spacewatch || KON || align=right | 3.0 km || 
|-id=182 bgcolor=#fefefe
| 231182 ||  || — || October 25, 2005 || Kitt Peak || Spacewatch || — || align=right data-sort-value="0.86" | 860 m || 
|-id=183 bgcolor=#fefefe
| 231183 ||  || — || October 25, 2005 || Catalina || CSS || — || align=right | 1.3 km || 
|-id=184 bgcolor=#fefefe
| 231184 ||  || — || October 26, 2005 || Kitt Peak || Spacewatch || — || align=right | 1.3 km || 
|-id=185 bgcolor=#fefefe
| 231185 ||  || — || October 27, 2005 || Kitt Peak || Spacewatch || — || align=right data-sort-value="0.97" | 970 m || 
|-id=186 bgcolor=#fefefe
| 231186 ||  || — || October 28, 2005 || Mount Lemmon || Mount Lemmon Survey || — || align=right | 1.1 km || 
|-id=187 bgcolor=#fefefe
| 231187 ||  || — || October 26, 2005 || Kitt Peak || Spacewatch || V || align=right data-sort-value="0.76" | 760 m || 
|-id=188 bgcolor=#fefefe
| 231188 ||  || — || October 29, 2005 || Catalina || CSS || — || align=right | 2.6 km || 
|-id=189 bgcolor=#E9E9E9
| 231189 ||  || — || October 25, 2005 || Kitt Peak || Spacewatch || — || align=right | 4.0 km || 
|-id=190 bgcolor=#fefefe
| 231190 ||  || — || October 27, 2005 || Kitt Peak || Spacewatch || V || align=right data-sort-value="0.96" | 960 m || 
|-id=191 bgcolor=#fefefe
| 231191 ||  || — || October 25, 2005 || Mount Lemmon || Mount Lemmon Survey || V || align=right | 1.0 km || 
|-id=192 bgcolor=#fefefe
| 231192 ||  || — || October 28, 2005 || Mount Lemmon || Mount Lemmon Survey || MAS || align=right data-sort-value="0.67" | 670 m || 
|-id=193 bgcolor=#fefefe
| 231193 ||  || — || October 30, 2005 || Mount Lemmon || Mount Lemmon Survey || — || align=right | 1.3 km || 
|-id=194 bgcolor=#fefefe
| 231194 ||  || — || October 31, 2005 || Anderson Mesa || LONEOS || — || align=right data-sort-value="0.90" | 900 m || 
|-id=195 bgcolor=#fefefe
| 231195 ||  || — || October 30, 2005 || Socorro || LINEAR || — || align=right data-sort-value="0.91" | 910 m || 
|-id=196 bgcolor=#fefefe
| 231196 ||  || — || October 27, 2005 || Mount Lemmon || Mount Lemmon Survey || — || align=right data-sort-value="0.98" | 980 m || 
|-id=197 bgcolor=#fefefe
| 231197 ||  || — || October 22, 2005 || Anderson Mesa || LONEOS || — || align=right | 1.2 km || 
|-id=198 bgcolor=#fefefe
| 231198 ||  || — || October 24, 2005 || Palomar || NEAT || V || align=right data-sort-value="0.79" | 790 m || 
|-id=199 bgcolor=#E9E9E9
| 231199 ||  || — || October 24, 2005 || Mauna Kea || D. J. Tholen || — || align=right | 3.1 km || 
|-id=200 bgcolor=#E9E9E9
| 231200 ||  || — || October 24, 2005 || Mauna Kea || D. J. Tholen || — || align=right | 3.2 km || 
|}

231201–231300 

|-bgcolor=#fefefe
| 231201 ||  || — || October 27, 2005 || Catalina || CSS || V || align=right data-sort-value="0.80" | 800 m || 
|-id=202 bgcolor=#fefefe
| 231202 ||  || — || November 3, 2005 || Catalina || CSS || FLO || align=right | 1.2 km || 
|-id=203 bgcolor=#fefefe
| 231203 ||  || — || November 3, 2005 || Mount Lemmon || Mount Lemmon Survey || — || align=right | 1.2 km || 
|-id=204 bgcolor=#fefefe
| 231204 ||  || — || November 4, 2005 || Mount Lemmon || Mount Lemmon Survey || — || align=right | 2.4 km || 
|-id=205 bgcolor=#fefefe
| 231205 ||  || — || November 2, 2005 || Socorro || LINEAR || NYS || align=right data-sort-value="0.96" | 960 m || 
|-id=206 bgcolor=#E9E9E9
| 231206 ||  || — || November 10, 2005 || Catalina || CSS || — || align=right | 2.9 km || 
|-id=207 bgcolor=#E9E9E9
| 231207 ||  || — || November 4, 2005 || Kitt Peak || Spacewatch || — || align=right | 2.9 km || 
|-id=208 bgcolor=#fefefe
| 231208 ||  || — || November 3, 2005 || Mount Lemmon || Mount Lemmon Survey || V || align=right data-sort-value="0.95" | 950 m || 
|-id=209 bgcolor=#fefefe
| 231209 ||  || — || November 21, 2005 || Kitt Peak || Spacewatch || MAS || align=right data-sort-value="0.96" | 960 m || 
|-id=210 bgcolor=#fefefe
| 231210 ||  || — || November 21, 2005 || Kitt Peak || Spacewatch || — || align=right | 1.0 km || 
|-id=211 bgcolor=#fefefe
| 231211 ||  || — || November 22, 2005 || Kitt Peak || Spacewatch || — || align=right | 1.2 km || 
|-id=212 bgcolor=#fefefe
| 231212 ||  || — || November 30, 2005 || Mayhill || A. Lowe || — || align=right data-sort-value="0.92" | 920 m || 
|-id=213 bgcolor=#fefefe
| 231213 ||  || — || November 28, 2005 || Mount Lemmon || Mount Lemmon Survey || NYS || align=right | 1.1 km || 
|-id=214 bgcolor=#fefefe
| 231214 ||  || — || November 25, 2005 || Mount Lemmon || Mount Lemmon Survey || V || align=right data-sort-value="0.99" | 990 m || 
|-id=215 bgcolor=#fefefe
| 231215 ||  || — || November 26, 2005 || Mount Lemmon || Mount Lemmon Survey || NYS || align=right data-sort-value="0.95" | 950 m || 
|-id=216 bgcolor=#fefefe
| 231216 ||  || — || November 26, 2005 || Kitt Peak || Spacewatch || MAS || align=right data-sort-value="0.96" | 960 m || 
|-id=217 bgcolor=#fefefe
| 231217 ||  || — || November 25, 2005 || Catalina || CSS || FLO || align=right | 1.0 km || 
|-id=218 bgcolor=#fefefe
| 231218 ||  || — || November 26, 2005 || Mount Lemmon || Mount Lemmon Survey || NYS || align=right data-sort-value="0.64" | 640 m || 
|-id=219 bgcolor=#fefefe
| 231219 ||  || — || November 28, 2005 || Kitt Peak || Spacewatch || — || align=right | 1.1 km || 
|-id=220 bgcolor=#E9E9E9
| 231220 ||  || — || November 29, 2005 || Socorro || LINEAR || — || align=right | 1.7 km || 
|-id=221 bgcolor=#E9E9E9
| 231221 ||  || — || November 25, 2005 || Mount Lemmon || Mount Lemmon Survey || — || align=right | 2.0 km || 
|-id=222 bgcolor=#E9E9E9
| 231222 ||  || — || November 25, 2005 || Mount Lemmon || Mount Lemmon Survey || — || align=right | 2.1 km || 
|-id=223 bgcolor=#E9E9E9
| 231223 ||  || — || November 28, 2005 || Catalina || CSS || GER || align=right | 1.7 km || 
|-id=224 bgcolor=#fefefe
| 231224 ||  || — || November 30, 2005 || Kitt Peak || Spacewatch || NYS || align=right data-sort-value="0.99" | 990 m || 
|-id=225 bgcolor=#fefefe
| 231225 ||  || — || November 30, 2005 || Kitt Peak || Spacewatch || MAS || align=right data-sort-value="0.92" | 920 m || 
|-id=226 bgcolor=#E9E9E9
| 231226 ||  || — || November 30, 2005 || Kitt Peak || Spacewatch || — || align=right | 2.9 km || 
|-id=227 bgcolor=#fefefe
| 231227 ||  || — || November 30, 2005 || Kitt Peak || Spacewatch || NYS || align=right data-sort-value="0.93" | 930 m || 
|-id=228 bgcolor=#fefefe
| 231228 ||  || — || November 30, 2005 || Socorro || LINEAR || — || align=right | 2.5 km || 
|-id=229 bgcolor=#fefefe
| 231229 ||  || — || November 29, 2005 || Mount Lemmon || Mount Lemmon Survey || — || align=right | 1.4 km || 
|-id=230 bgcolor=#fefefe
| 231230 ||  || — || December 1, 2005 || Socorro || LINEAR || MAS || align=right data-sort-value="0.89" | 890 m || 
|-id=231 bgcolor=#fefefe
| 231231 ||  || — || December 1, 2005 || Mount Lemmon || Mount Lemmon Survey || MAS || align=right data-sort-value="0.78" | 780 m || 
|-id=232 bgcolor=#fefefe
| 231232 ||  || — || December 3, 2005 || Kitt Peak || Spacewatch || ERI || align=right | 2.6 km || 
|-id=233 bgcolor=#E9E9E9
| 231233 ||  || — || December 4, 2005 || Kitt Peak || Spacewatch || — || align=right | 3.3 km || 
|-id=234 bgcolor=#E9E9E9
| 231234 ||  || — || December 4, 2005 || Kitt Peak || Spacewatch || WIT || align=right | 1.7 km || 
|-id=235 bgcolor=#fefefe
| 231235 ||  || — || December 7, 2005 || Socorro || LINEAR || — || align=right | 3.0 km || 
|-id=236 bgcolor=#fefefe
| 231236 ||  || — || December 5, 2005 || Kitt Peak || Spacewatch || MAS || align=right data-sort-value="0.89" | 890 m || 
|-id=237 bgcolor=#fefefe
| 231237 ||  || — || December 10, 2005 || Kitt Peak || Spacewatch || — || align=right | 1.4 km || 
|-id=238 bgcolor=#fefefe
| 231238 ||  || — || December 21, 2005 || Catalina || CSS || KLI || align=right | 2.9 km || 
|-id=239 bgcolor=#fefefe
| 231239 ||  || — || December 21, 2005 || Kitt Peak || Spacewatch || NYS || align=right data-sort-value="0.64" | 640 m || 
|-id=240 bgcolor=#fefefe
| 231240 ||  || — || December 24, 2005 || Kitt Peak || Spacewatch || NYS || align=right data-sort-value="0.91" | 910 m || 
|-id=241 bgcolor=#fefefe
| 231241 ||  || — || December 25, 2005 || Kitt Peak || Spacewatch || V || align=right | 1.0 km || 
|-id=242 bgcolor=#fefefe
| 231242 ||  || — || December 26, 2005 || Kitt Peak || Spacewatch || — || align=right | 1.2 km || 
|-id=243 bgcolor=#E9E9E9
| 231243 ||  || — || December 25, 2005 || Anderson Mesa || LONEOS || MAR || align=right | 1.7 km || 
|-id=244 bgcolor=#E9E9E9
| 231244 ||  || — || December 24, 2005 || Kitt Peak || Spacewatch || — || align=right | 1.9 km || 
|-id=245 bgcolor=#E9E9E9
| 231245 ||  || — || December 25, 2005 || Kitt Peak || Spacewatch || — || align=right | 2.2 km || 
|-id=246 bgcolor=#fefefe
| 231246 ||  || — || December 26, 2005 || Kitt Peak || Spacewatch || — || align=right | 2.2 km || 
|-id=247 bgcolor=#E9E9E9
| 231247 ||  || — || December 25, 2005 || Mount Lemmon || Mount Lemmon Survey || — || align=right | 3.3 km || 
|-id=248 bgcolor=#E9E9E9
| 231248 ||  || — || December 25, 2005 || Mount Lemmon || Mount Lemmon Survey || — || align=right | 1.2 km || 
|-id=249 bgcolor=#fefefe
| 231249 ||  || — || December 26, 2005 || Kitt Peak || Spacewatch || V || align=right data-sort-value="0.96" | 960 m || 
|-id=250 bgcolor=#E9E9E9
| 231250 ||  || — || December 28, 2005 || Mount Lemmon || Mount Lemmon Survey || — || align=right | 4.1 km || 
|-id=251 bgcolor=#E9E9E9
| 231251 ||  || — || December 29, 2005 || Socorro || LINEAR || — || align=right | 1.7 km || 
|-id=252 bgcolor=#E9E9E9
| 231252 ||  || — || December 28, 2005 || Catalina || CSS || — || align=right | 1.9 km || 
|-id=253 bgcolor=#E9E9E9
| 231253 ||  || — || December 28, 2005 || Catalina || CSS || EUN || align=right | 2.0 km || 
|-id=254 bgcolor=#E9E9E9
| 231254 ||  || — || December 27, 2005 || Kitt Peak || Spacewatch || — || align=right | 3.0 km || 
|-id=255 bgcolor=#fefefe
| 231255 ||  || — || December 29, 2005 || Kitt Peak || Spacewatch || — || align=right | 1.9 km || 
|-id=256 bgcolor=#E9E9E9
| 231256 ||  || — || December 30, 2005 || Kitt Peak || Spacewatch || — || align=right | 1.4 km || 
|-id=257 bgcolor=#E9E9E9
| 231257 ||  || — || December 25, 2005 || Catalina || CSS || BAR || align=right | 1.8 km || 
|-id=258 bgcolor=#E9E9E9
| 231258 ||  || — || December 25, 2005 || Mount Lemmon || Mount Lemmon Survey || EUN || align=right | 2.1 km || 
|-id=259 bgcolor=#E9E9E9
| 231259 ||  || — || December 25, 2005 || Mount Lemmon || Mount Lemmon Survey || — || align=right | 1.9 km || 
|-id=260 bgcolor=#E9E9E9
| 231260 ||  || — || December 25, 2005 || Catalina || CSS || EUN || align=right | 2.1 km || 
|-id=261 bgcolor=#E9E9E9
| 231261 ||  || — || December 25, 2005 || Kitt Peak || Spacewatch || — || align=right | 2.5 km || 
|-id=262 bgcolor=#E9E9E9
| 231262 ||  || — || December 25, 2005 || Catalina || CSS || MIT || align=right | 3.8 km || 
|-id=263 bgcolor=#d6d6d6
| 231263 ||  || — || December 25, 2005 || Catalina || CSS || — || align=right | 4.6 km || 
|-id=264 bgcolor=#fefefe
| 231264 ||  || — || December 31, 2005 || Kitt Peak || Spacewatch || CLA || align=right | 2.6 km || 
|-id=265 bgcolor=#E9E9E9
| 231265 Saulperlmutter ||  ||  || January 5, 2006 || Vallemare di Borbona || V. S. Casulli || — || align=right | 3.0 km || 
|-id=266 bgcolor=#E9E9E9
| 231266 ||  || — || January 5, 2006 || Mount Lemmon || Mount Lemmon Survey || — || align=right | 2.2 km || 
|-id=267 bgcolor=#E9E9E9
| 231267 ||  || — || January 4, 2006 || Mount Lemmon || Mount Lemmon Survey || — || align=right | 2.4 km || 
|-id=268 bgcolor=#E9E9E9
| 231268 ||  || — || January 5, 2006 || Catalina || CSS || — || align=right | 3.0 km || 
|-id=269 bgcolor=#E9E9E9
| 231269 ||  || — || January 5, 2006 || Catalina || CSS || — || align=right | 3.2 km || 
|-id=270 bgcolor=#E9E9E9
| 231270 ||  || — || January 5, 2006 || Kitt Peak || Spacewatch || — || align=right | 3.1 km || 
|-id=271 bgcolor=#E9E9E9
| 231271 ||  || — || January 6, 2006 || Kitt Peak || Spacewatch || — || align=right | 3.3 km || 
|-id=272 bgcolor=#fefefe
| 231272 ||  || — || January 5, 2006 || Kitt Peak || Spacewatch || NYS || align=right data-sort-value="0.96" | 960 m || 
|-id=273 bgcolor=#E9E9E9
| 231273 ||  || — || January 7, 2006 || Kitt Peak || Spacewatch || — || align=right | 1.2 km || 
|-id=274 bgcolor=#fefefe
| 231274 ||  || — || January 6, 2006 || Kitt Peak || Spacewatch || — || align=right | 1.4 km || 
|-id=275 bgcolor=#E9E9E9
| 231275 ||  || — || January 6, 2006 || Mount Lemmon || Mount Lemmon Survey || — || align=right | 1.1 km || 
|-id=276 bgcolor=#E9E9E9
| 231276 ||  || — || January 7, 2006 || Anderson Mesa || LONEOS || — || align=right | 2.1 km || 
|-id=277 bgcolor=#E9E9E9
| 231277 ||  || — || January 21, 2006 || Mount Lemmon || Mount Lemmon Survey || — || align=right | 1.0 km || 
|-id=278 bgcolor=#E9E9E9
| 231278 Kárpáti ||  ||  || January 25, 2006 || Piszkéstető || K. Sárneczky || — || align=right | 2.6 km || 
|-id=279 bgcolor=#E9E9E9
| 231279 ||  || — || January 22, 2006 || Mount Lemmon || Mount Lemmon Survey || — || align=right | 2.5 km || 
|-id=280 bgcolor=#E9E9E9
| 231280 ||  || — || January 20, 2006 || Kitt Peak || Spacewatch || — || align=right | 1.5 km || 
|-id=281 bgcolor=#E9E9E9
| 231281 ||  || — || January 21, 2006 || Kitt Peak || Spacewatch || HEN || align=right | 1.5 km || 
|-id=282 bgcolor=#d6d6d6
| 231282 ||  || — || January 23, 2006 || Junk Bond || D. Healy || 628 || align=right | 2.1 km || 
|-id=283 bgcolor=#E9E9E9
| 231283 ||  || — || January 23, 2006 || Mount Lemmon || Mount Lemmon Survey || — || align=right | 1.2 km || 
|-id=284 bgcolor=#E9E9E9
| 231284 ||  || — || January 23, 2006 || Kitt Peak || Spacewatch || — || align=right | 1.3 km || 
|-id=285 bgcolor=#E9E9E9
| 231285 ||  || — || January 23, 2006 || Kitt Peak || Spacewatch || — || align=right | 2.5 km || 
|-id=286 bgcolor=#E9E9E9
| 231286 ||  || — || January 23, 2006 || Kitt Peak || Spacewatch || — || align=right | 3.5 km || 
|-id=287 bgcolor=#fefefe
| 231287 ||  || — || January 19, 2006 || Catalina || CSS || — || align=right | 1.0 km || 
|-id=288 bgcolor=#E9E9E9
| 231288 ||  || — || January 23, 2006 || Kitt Peak || Spacewatch || — || align=right | 1.7 km || 
|-id=289 bgcolor=#E9E9E9
| 231289 ||  || — || January 26, 2006 || Kitt Peak || Spacewatch || MIS || align=right | 2.2 km || 
|-id=290 bgcolor=#E9E9E9
| 231290 ||  || — || January 25, 2006 || Junk Bond || D. Healy || — || align=right | 1.9 km || 
|-id=291 bgcolor=#E9E9E9
| 231291 ||  || — || January 23, 2006 || Mount Lemmon || Mount Lemmon Survey || MAR || align=right | 1.7 km || 
|-id=292 bgcolor=#E9E9E9
| 231292 ||  || — || January 25, 2006 || Kitt Peak || Spacewatch || — || align=right | 2.6 km || 
|-id=293 bgcolor=#d6d6d6
| 231293 ||  || — || January 26, 2006 || Kitt Peak || Spacewatch || — || align=right | 2.9 km || 
|-id=294 bgcolor=#E9E9E9
| 231294 ||  || — || January 26, 2006 || Kitt Peak || Spacewatch || — || align=right | 2.7 km || 
|-id=295 bgcolor=#E9E9E9
| 231295 ||  || — || January 26, 2006 || Kitt Peak || Spacewatch || — || align=right | 3.5 km || 
|-id=296 bgcolor=#E9E9E9
| 231296 ||  || — || January 26, 2006 || Kitt Peak || Spacewatch || MIS || align=right | 3.4 km || 
|-id=297 bgcolor=#E9E9E9
| 231297 ||  || — || January 25, 2006 || Kitt Peak || Spacewatch || — || align=right | 1.8 km || 
|-id=298 bgcolor=#E9E9E9
| 231298 ||  || — || January 23, 2006 || Catalina || CSS || EUN || align=right | 2.0 km || 
|-id=299 bgcolor=#E9E9E9
| 231299 ||  || — || January 23, 2006 || Catalina || CSS || — || align=right | 3.0 km || 
|-id=300 bgcolor=#E9E9E9
| 231300 ||  || — || January 26, 2006 || Kitt Peak || Spacewatch || BRG || align=right | 1.9 km || 
|}

231301–231400 

|-bgcolor=#E9E9E9
| 231301 ||  || — || January 26, 2006 || Anderson Mesa || LONEOS || ADE || align=right | 4.5 km || 
|-id=302 bgcolor=#E9E9E9
| 231302 ||  || — || January 26, 2006 || Mount Lemmon || Mount Lemmon Survey || — || align=right | 2.5 km || 
|-id=303 bgcolor=#d6d6d6
| 231303 ||  || — || January 26, 2006 || Mount Lemmon || Mount Lemmon Survey || EOS || align=right | 2.9 km || 
|-id=304 bgcolor=#E9E9E9
| 231304 ||  || — || January 26, 2006 || Catalina || CSS || RAF || align=right | 1.6 km || 
|-id=305 bgcolor=#E9E9E9
| 231305 ||  || — || January 26, 2006 || Mount Lemmon || Mount Lemmon Survey || AST || align=right | 2.0 km || 
|-id=306 bgcolor=#E9E9E9
| 231306 ||  || — || January 27, 2006 || Mount Lemmon || Mount Lemmon Survey || — || align=right | 1.5 km || 
|-id=307 bgcolor=#d6d6d6
| 231307 Peterfalk ||  ||  || January 28, 2006 || Nogales || J.-C. Merlin || KAR || align=right | 1.3 km || 
|-id=308 bgcolor=#E9E9E9
| 231308 ||  || — || January 28, 2006 || Kitt Peak || Spacewatch || — || align=right | 1.4 km || 
|-id=309 bgcolor=#E9E9E9
| 231309 ||  || — || January 28, 2006 || Kitt Peak || Spacewatch || — || align=right | 3.3 km || 
|-id=310 bgcolor=#E9E9E9
| 231310 ||  || — || January 28, 2006 || Mount Lemmon || Mount Lemmon Survey || — || align=right | 3.4 km || 
|-id=311 bgcolor=#E9E9E9
| 231311 ||  || — || January 23, 2006 || Socorro || LINEAR || — || align=right | 1.5 km || 
|-id=312 bgcolor=#E9E9E9
| 231312 ||  || — || January 31, 2006 || Kitt Peak || Spacewatch || HEN || align=right | 1.5 km || 
|-id=313 bgcolor=#E9E9E9
| 231313 ||  || — || January 31, 2006 || Kitt Peak || Spacewatch || — || align=right | 1.5 km || 
|-id=314 bgcolor=#E9E9E9
| 231314 ||  || — || January 26, 2006 || Catalina || CSS || — || align=right | 2.2 km || 
|-id=315 bgcolor=#E9E9E9
| 231315 ||  || — || January 27, 2006 || Catalina || CSS || — || align=right | 3.6 km || 
|-id=316 bgcolor=#E9E9E9
| 231316 ||  || — || January 23, 2006 || Kitt Peak || Spacewatch || — || align=right | 2.0 km || 
|-id=317 bgcolor=#E9E9E9
| 231317 ||  || — || February 1, 2006 || Mount Lemmon || Mount Lemmon Survey || — || align=right | 1.2 km || 
|-id=318 bgcolor=#E9E9E9
| 231318 ||  || — || February 2, 2006 || Mount Lemmon || Mount Lemmon Survey || HEN || align=right | 1.5 km || 
|-id=319 bgcolor=#E9E9E9
| 231319 ||  || — || February 2, 2006 || Kitt Peak || Spacewatch || — || align=right | 2.7 km || 
|-id=320 bgcolor=#E9E9E9
| 231320 ||  || — || February 4, 2006 || Mount Lemmon || Mount Lemmon Survey || — || align=right | 2.4 km || 
|-id=321 bgcolor=#E9E9E9
| 231321 ||  || — || February 4, 2006 || Kitt Peak || Spacewatch || — || align=right | 2.6 km || 
|-id=322 bgcolor=#E9E9E9
| 231322 ||  || — || February 21, 2006 || Calvin-Rehoboth || L. A. Molnar || — || align=right | 2.9 km || 
|-id=323 bgcolor=#E9E9E9
| 231323 ||  || — || February 20, 2006 || Kitt Peak || Spacewatch || HEN || align=right | 1.3 km || 
|-id=324 bgcolor=#E9E9E9
| 231324 ||  || — || February 20, 2006 || Catalina || CSS || — || align=right | 2.3 km || 
|-id=325 bgcolor=#d6d6d6
| 231325 ||  || — || February 20, 2006 || Catalina || CSS || EOS || align=right | 3.1 km || 
|-id=326 bgcolor=#E9E9E9
| 231326 ||  || — || February 20, 2006 || Kitt Peak || Spacewatch || — || align=right | 2.8 km || 
|-id=327 bgcolor=#E9E9E9
| 231327 ||  || — || February 20, 2006 || Kitt Peak || Spacewatch || — || align=right | 2.9 km || 
|-id=328 bgcolor=#d6d6d6
| 231328 ||  || — || February 21, 2006 || Mount Lemmon || Mount Lemmon Survey || — || align=right | 3.0 km || 
|-id=329 bgcolor=#E9E9E9
| 231329 ||  || — || February 24, 2006 || Kitt Peak || Spacewatch || — || align=right | 2.2 km || 
|-id=330 bgcolor=#E9E9E9
| 231330 ||  || — || February 21, 2006 || Catalina || CSS || JUN || align=right | 1.5 km || 
|-id=331 bgcolor=#d6d6d6
| 231331 ||  || — || February 24, 2006 || Kitt Peak || Spacewatch || — || align=right | 4.3 km || 
|-id=332 bgcolor=#E9E9E9
| 231332 ||  || — || February 25, 2006 || Mount Lemmon || Mount Lemmon Survey || HOF || align=right | 2.7 km || 
|-id=333 bgcolor=#E9E9E9
| 231333 ||  || — || February 27, 2006 || Mount Lemmon || Mount Lemmon Survey || HOF || align=right | 4.1 km || 
|-id=334 bgcolor=#E9E9E9
| 231334 ||  || — || February 27, 2006 || Kitt Peak || Spacewatch || — || align=right | 3.3 km || 
|-id=335 bgcolor=#E9E9E9
| 231335 ||  || — || February 28, 2006 || Catalina || CSS || — || align=right | 3.8 km || 
|-id=336 bgcolor=#E9E9E9
| 231336 ||  || — || February 24, 2006 || Catalina || CSS || — || align=right | 1.6 km || 
|-id=337 bgcolor=#E9E9E9
| 231337 ||  || — || February 25, 2006 || Anderson Mesa || LONEOS || — || align=right | 3.6 km || 
|-id=338 bgcolor=#E9E9E9
| 231338 ||  || — || February 25, 2006 || Anderson Mesa || LONEOS || ADE || align=right | 3.4 km || 
|-id=339 bgcolor=#E9E9E9
| 231339 ||  || — || February 18, 2006 || Anderson Mesa || LONEOS || — || align=right | 3.9 km || 
|-id=340 bgcolor=#E9E9E9
| 231340 ||  || — || February 25, 2006 || Mount Lemmon || Mount Lemmon Survey || — || align=right | 3.1 km || 
|-id=341 bgcolor=#E9E9E9
| 231341 ||  || — || February 25, 2006 || Kitt Peak || Spacewatch || NEM || align=right | 3.1 km || 
|-id=342 bgcolor=#E9E9E9
| 231342 ||  || — || March 3, 2006 || Kitt Peak || Spacewatch || HEN || align=right | 1.0 km || 
|-id=343 bgcolor=#E9E9E9
| 231343 ||  || — || March 3, 2006 || Mount Lemmon || Mount Lemmon Survey || — || align=right | 2.5 km || 
|-id=344 bgcolor=#E9E9E9
| 231344 ||  || — || March 4, 2006 || Kitt Peak || Spacewatch || — || align=right | 2.6 km || 
|-id=345 bgcolor=#E9E9E9
| 231345 ||  || — || March 4, 2006 || Kitt Peak || Spacewatch || NEM || align=right | 2.5 km || 
|-id=346 bgcolor=#E9E9E9
| 231346 Taofanlin ||  ||  || March 10, 2006 || Lulin Observatory || H.-C. Lin, Q.-z. Ye || — || align=right | 2.8 km || 
|-id=347 bgcolor=#d6d6d6
| 231347 ||  || — || March 23, 2006 || Kitt Peak || Spacewatch || — || align=right | 3.3 km || 
|-id=348 bgcolor=#d6d6d6
| 231348 ||  || — || March 23, 2006 || Kitt Peak || Spacewatch || TRE || align=right | 3.9 km || 
|-id=349 bgcolor=#E9E9E9
| 231349 ||  || — || March 23, 2006 || Mount Lemmon || Mount Lemmon Survey || AGN || align=right | 1.7 km || 
|-id=350 bgcolor=#E9E9E9
| 231350 ||  || — || March 24, 2006 || Mount Lemmon || Mount Lemmon Survey || — || align=right | 2.6 km || 
|-id=351 bgcolor=#E9E9E9
| 231351 ||  || — || March 24, 2006 || Siding Spring || SSS || — || align=right | 2.3 km || 
|-id=352 bgcolor=#E9E9E9
| 231352 ||  || — || March 24, 2006 || Mount Lemmon || Mount Lemmon Survey || AGN || align=right | 1.6 km || 
|-id=353 bgcolor=#E9E9E9
| 231353 ||  || — || April 2, 2006 || Kitt Peak || Spacewatch || — || align=right | 3.4 km || 
|-id=354 bgcolor=#d6d6d6
| 231354 ||  || — || April 2, 2006 || Kitt Peak || Spacewatch || — || align=right | 3.0 km || 
|-id=355 bgcolor=#d6d6d6
| 231355 ||  || — || April 2, 2006 || Kitt Peak || Spacewatch || — || align=right | 3.7 km || 
|-id=356 bgcolor=#d6d6d6
| 231356 ||  || — || April 2, 2006 || Kitt Peak || Spacewatch || — || align=right | 3.7 km || 
|-id=357 bgcolor=#d6d6d6
| 231357 ||  || — || April 2, 2006 || Kitt Peak || Spacewatch || KOR || align=right | 1.7 km || 
|-id=358 bgcolor=#E9E9E9
| 231358 ||  || — || April 7, 2006 || Catalina || CSS || — || align=right | 3.4 km || 
|-id=359 bgcolor=#E9E9E9
| 231359 ||  || — || April 8, 2006 || Mount Lemmon || Mount Lemmon Survey || — || align=right | 2.2 km || 
|-id=360 bgcolor=#E9E9E9
| 231360 ||  || — || April 7, 2006 || Catalina || CSS || — || align=right | 3.8 km || 
|-id=361 bgcolor=#E9E9E9
| 231361 ||  || — || April 2, 2006 || Anderson Mesa || LONEOS || GEF || align=right | 2.0 km || 
|-id=362 bgcolor=#E9E9E9
| 231362 ||  || — || April 6, 2006 || Catalina || CSS || CLO || align=right | 3.2 km || 
|-id=363 bgcolor=#E9E9E9
| 231363 ||  || — || April 7, 2006 || Catalina || CSS || — || align=right | 2.9 km || 
|-id=364 bgcolor=#d6d6d6
| 231364 ||  || — || April 8, 2006 || Kitt Peak || Spacewatch || — || align=right | 3.6 km || 
|-id=365 bgcolor=#E9E9E9
| 231365 ||  || — || April 18, 2006 || Palomar || NEAT || NEM || align=right | 3.3 km || 
|-id=366 bgcolor=#E9E9E9
| 231366 ||  || — || April 19, 2006 || Palomar || NEAT || — || align=right | 4.1 km || 
|-id=367 bgcolor=#d6d6d6
| 231367 ||  || — || April 18, 2006 || Catalina || CSS || EOS || align=right | 3.2 km || 
|-id=368 bgcolor=#E9E9E9
| 231368 ||  || — || April 22, 2006 || Piszkéstető || K. Sárneczky || AGN || align=right | 1.6 km || 
|-id=369 bgcolor=#d6d6d6
| 231369 ||  || — || April 20, 2006 || Kitt Peak || Spacewatch || — || align=right | 3.1 km || 
|-id=370 bgcolor=#E9E9E9
| 231370 ||  || — || April 20, 2006 || Kitt Peak || Spacewatch || — || align=right | 2.3 km || 
|-id=371 bgcolor=#d6d6d6
| 231371 ||  || — || April 20, 2006 || Kitt Peak || Spacewatch || — || align=right | 3.7 km || 
|-id=372 bgcolor=#E9E9E9
| 231372 ||  || — || April 20, 2006 || Kitt Peak || Spacewatch || — || align=right | 2.7 km || 
|-id=373 bgcolor=#d6d6d6
| 231373 ||  || — || April 21, 2006 || Kitt Peak || Spacewatch || — || align=right | 6.3 km || 
|-id=374 bgcolor=#d6d6d6
| 231374 ||  || — || April 21, 2006 || Kitt Peak || Spacewatch || EOS || align=right | 2.3 km || 
|-id=375 bgcolor=#E9E9E9
| 231375 ||  || — || April 26, 2006 || Kitt Peak || Spacewatch || — || align=right | 1.7 km || 
|-id=376 bgcolor=#d6d6d6
| 231376 ||  || — || April 24, 2006 || Kitt Peak || Spacewatch || — || align=right | 3.3 km || 
|-id=377 bgcolor=#d6d6d6
| 231377 ||  || — || April 30, 2006 || Kitt Peak || Spacewatch || — || align=right | 3.1 km || 
|-id=378 bgcolor=#d6d6d6
| 231378 ||  || — || April 30, 2006 || Kitt Peak || Spacewatch || EOS || align=right | 3.1 km || 
|-id=379 bgcolor=#d6d6d6
| 231379 ||  || — || April 26, 2006 || Cerro Tololo || M. W. Buie || — || align=right | 3.4 km || 
|-id=380 bgcolor=#d6d6d6
| 231380 || 2006 JJ || — || May 1, 2006 || Reedy Creek || J. Broughton || — || align=right | 3.9 km || 
|-id=381 bgcolor=#d6d6d6
| 231381 ||  || — || May 1, 2006 || Kitt Peak || Spacewatch || VER || align=right | 4.2 km || 
|-id=382 bgcolor=#d6d6d6
| 231382 ||  || — || May 4, 2006 || Kitt Peak || Spacewatch || — || align=right | 3.9 km || 
|-id=383 bgcolor=#d6d6d6
| 231383 ||  || — || May 2, 2006 || Kitt Peak || Spacewatch || KOR || align=right | 1.7 km || 
|-id=384 bgcolor=#d6d6d6
| 231384 ||  || — || May 1, 2006 || Kitt Peak || Spacewatch || URS || align=right | 7.2 km || 
|-id=385 bgcolor=#fefefe
| 231385 ||  || — || May 8, 2006 || Mount Lemmon || Mount Lemmon Survey || FLO || align=right data-sort-value="0.90" | 900 m || 
|-id=386 bgcolor=#d6d6d6
| 231386 ||  || — || May 8, 2006 || Mount Lemmon || Mount Lemmon Survey || HYG || align=right | 3.9 km || 
|-id=387 bgcolor=#d6d6d6
| 231387 ||  || — || May 19, 2006 || Mount Lemmon || Mount Lemmon Survey || — || align=right | 3.5 km || 
|-id=388 bgcolor=#d6d6d6
| 231388 ||  || — || May 20, 2006 || Catalina || CSS || — || align=right | 6.2 km || 
|-id=389 bgcolor=#d6d6d6
| 231389 ||  || — || May 21, 2006 || Kitt Peak || Spacewatch || EOS || align=right | 3.1 km || 
|-id=390 bgcolor=#d6d6d6
| 231390 ||  || — || May 20, 2006 || Kitt Peak || Spacewatch || THM || align=right | 3.4 km || 
|-id=391 bgcolor=#d6d6d6
| 231391 ||  || — || May 21, 2006 || Mount Lemmon || Mount Lemmon Survey || THM || align=right | 2.9 km || 
|-id=392 bgcolor=#d6d6d6
| 231392 ||  || — || May 23, 2006 || Mount Lemmon || Mount Lemmon Survey || EOS || align=right | 3.2 km || 
|-id=393 bgcolor=#E9E9E9
| 231393 ||  || — || May 24, 2006 || Mount Lemmon || Mount Lemmon Survey || — || align=right | 3.1 km || 
|-id=394 bgcolor=#d6d6d6
| 231394 ||  || — || May 24, 2006 || Kitt Peak || Spacewatch || — || align=right | 3.4 km || 
|-id=395 bgcolor=#d6d6d6
| 231395 ||  || — || May 29, 2006 || Kitt Peak || Spacewatch || HYG || align=right | 4.7 km || 
|-id=396 bgcolor=#d6d6d6
| 231396 ||  || — || May 29, 2006 || Kitt Peak || Spacewatch || — || align=right | 4.6 km || 
|-id=397 bgcolor=#FA8072
| 231397 ||  || — || June 24, 2006 || Mount Lemmon || LONEOS || H || align=right | 1.2 km || 
|-id=398 bgcolor=#d6d6d6
| 231398 ||  || — || August 13, 2006 || Palomar || NEAT || 3:2 || align=right | 8.4 km || 
|-id=399 bgcolor=#d6d6d6
| 231399 ||  || — || August 27, 2006 || Kitt Peak || Spacewatch || — || align=right | 3.4 km || 
|-id=400 bgcolor=#d6d6d6
| 231400 ||  || — || September 17, 2006 || Kitt Peak || Spacewatch || SHU3:2 || align=right | 7.6 km || 
|}

231401–231500 

|-bgcolor=#E9E9E9
| 231401 ||  || — || September 27, 2006 || Mount Lemmon || Mount Lemmon Survey || — || align=right | 1.6 km || 
|-id=402 bgcolor=#fefefe
| 231402 ||  || — || October 4, 2006 || Mount Lemmon || Mount Lemmon Survey || H || align=right data-sort-value="0.76" | 760 m || 
|-id=403 bgcolor=#fefefe
| 231403 ||  || — || November 22, 2006 || Catalina || CSS || H || align=right data-sort-value="0.81" | 810 m || 
|-id=404 bgcolor=#fefefe
| 231404 ||  || — || November 20, 2006 || Siding Spring || SSS || H || align=right data-sort-value="0.89" | 890 m || 
|-id=405 bgcolor=#fefefe
| 231405 ||  || — || November 27, 2006 || Mount Lemmon || Mount Lemmon Survey || FLO || align=right data-sort-value="0.68" | 680 m || 
|-id=406 bgcolor=#fefefe
| 231406 ||  || — || December 20, 2006 || Mount Lemmon || Mount Lemmon Survey || — || align=right data-sort-value="0.68" | 680 m || 
|-id=407 bgcolor=#fefefe
| 231407 ||  || — || December 21, 2006 || Mount Lemmon || Mount Lemmon Survey || — || align=right | 1.2 km || 
|-id=408 bgcolor=#fefefe
| 231408 ||  || — || January 9, 2007 || Catalina || CSS || — || align=right | 1.6 km || 
|-id=409 bgcolor=#d6d6d6
| 231409 ||  || — || January 17, 2007 || Catalina || CSS || NAE || align=right | 5.8 km || 
|-id=410 bgcolor=#fefefe
| 231410 ||  || — || January 28, 2007 || Mount Lemmon || Mount Lemmon Survey || FLO || align=right data-sort-value="0.87" | 870 m || 
|-id=411 bgcolor=#fefefe
| 231411 ||  || — || February 9, 2007 || Catalina || CSS || — || align=right | 2.9 km || 
|-id=412 bgcolor=#fefefe
| 231412 ||  || — || February 7, 2007 || Kitt Peak || Spacewatch || — || align=right | 1.2 km || 
|-id=413 bgcolor=#fefefe
| 231413 ||  || — || February 7, 2007 || Kitt Peak || Spacewatch || FLO || align=right data-sort-value="0.79" | 790 m || 
|-id=414 bgcolor=#fefefe
| 231414 ||  || — || February 19, 2007 || Catalina || CSS || PHO || align=right | 3.1 km || 
|-id=415 bgcolor=#fefefe
| 231415 ||  || — || February 16, 2007 || Palomar || NEAT || — || align=right data-sort-value="0.90" | 900 m || 
|-id=416 bgcolor=#fefefe
| 231416 ||  || — || February 21, 2007 || Mount Lemmon || Mount Lemmon Survey || MAS || align=right data-sort-value="0.84" | 840 m || 
|-id=417 bgcolor=#fefefe
| 231417 ||  || — || February 21, 2007 || Kitt Peak || Spacewatch || — || align=right | 1.0 km || 
|-id=418 bgcolor=#fefefe
| 231418 ||  || — || March 9, 2007 || Catalina || CSS || — || align=right | 1.2 km || 
|-id=419 bgcolor=#fefefe
| 231419 ||  || — || March 11, 2007 || Kitt Peak || Spacewatch || — || align=right | 1.4 km || 
|-id=420 bgcolor=#fefefe
| 231420 ||  || — || March 10, 2007 || Mount Lemmon || Mount Lemmon Survey || — || align=right data-sort-value="0.82" | 820 m || 
|-id=421 bgcolor=#E9E9E9
| 231421 ||  || — || March 12, 2007 || Mount Lemmon || Mount Lemmon Survey || — || align=right | 2.9 km || 
|-id=422 bgcolor=#fefefe
| 231422 ||  || — || March 10, 2007 || Kitt Peak || Spacewatch || FLO || align=right data-sort-value="0.86" | 860 m || 
|-id=423 bgcolor=#fefefe
| 231423 ||  || — || March 10, 2007 || Kitt Peak || Spacewatch || FLO || align=right data-sort-value="0.81" | 810 m || 
|-id=424 bgcolor=#fefefe
| 231424 ||  || — || March 10, 2007 || Kitt Peak || Spacewatch || — || align=right | 1.6 km || 
|-id=425 bgcolor=#fefefe
| 231425 ||  || — || March 11, 2007 || Mount Lemmon || Mount Lemmon Survey || — || align=right | 1.0 km || 
|-id=426 bgcolor=#fefefe
| 231426 ||  || — || March 11, 2007 || Kitt Peak || Spacewatch || NYS || align=right data-sort-value="0.93" | 930 m || 
|-id=427 bgcolor=#fefefe
| 231427 ||  || — || March 11, 2007 || Mount Lemmon || Mount Lemmon Survey || — || align=right | 1.1 km || 
|-id=428 bgcolor=#E9E9E9
| 231428 ||  || — || March 11, 2007 || Kitt Peak || Spacewatch || — || align=right | 2.7 km || 
|-id=429 bgcolor=#fefefe
| 231429 ||  || — || March 14, 2007 || Anderson Mesa || LONEOS || — || align=right data-sort-value="0.91" | 910 m || 
|-id=430 bgcolor=#fefefe
| 231430 ||  || — || March 9, 2007 || Palomar || NEAT || FLO || align=right | 1.0 km || 
|-id=431 bgcolor=#fefefe
| 231431 ||  || — || March 9, 2007 || Mount Lemmon || Mount Lemmon Survey || NYS || align=right data-sort-value="0.76" | 760 m || 
|-id=432 bgcolor=#fefefe
| 231432 ||  || — || March 12, 2007 || Kitt Peak || Spacewatch || V || align=right data-sort-value="0.99" | 990 m || 
|-id=433 bgcolor=#fefefe
| 231433 ||  || — || March 14, 2007 || Mount Lemmon || Mount Lemmon Survey || FLO || align=right | 1.1 km || 
|-id=434 bgcolor=#fefefe
| 231434 ||  || — || March 14, 2007 || Kitt Peak || Spacewatch || FLO || align=right data-sort-value="0.68" | 680 m || 
|-id=435 bgcolor=#fefefe
| 231435 ||  || — || March 15, 2007 || Kitt Peak || Spacewatch || — || align=right | 1.4 km || 
|-id=436 bgcolor=#fefefe
| 231436 ||  || — || March 16, 2007 || Catalina || CSS || — || align=right | 1.3 km || 
|-id=437 bgcolor=#fefefe
| 231437 ||  || — || March 16, 2007 || Kitt Peak || Spacewatch || — || align=right | 2.3 km || 
|-id=438 bgcolor=#E9E9E9
| 231438 ||  || — || March 19, 2007 || Catalina || CSS || — || align=right | 1.9 km || 
|-id=439 bgcolor=#E9E9E9
| 231439 ||  || — || March 20, 2007 || Kitt Peak || Spacewatch || — || align=right | 2.1 km || 
|-id=440 bgcolor=#fefefe
| 231440 ||  || — || April 11, 2007 || Kitt Peak || Spacewatch || — || align=right | 1.7 km || 
|-id=441 bgcolor=#E9E9E9
| 231441 ||  || — || April 11, 2007 || Catalina || CSS || — || align=right | 1.2 km || 
|-id=442 bgcolor=#fefefe
| 231442 ||  || — || April 15, 2007 || Catalina || CSS || V || align=right data-sort-value="0.85" | 850 m || 
|-id=443 bgcolor=#fefefe
| 231443 ||  || — || April 14, 2007 || Kitt Peak || Spacewatch || — || align=right data-sort-value="0.99" | 990 m || 
|-id=444 bgcolor=#fefefe
| 231444 ||  || — || April 14, 2007 || Mount Lemmon || Mount Lemmon Survey || NYS || align=right data-sort-value="0.73" | 730 m || 
|-id=445 bgcolor=#fefefe
| 231445 ||  || — || April 15, 2007 || Kitt Peak || Spacewatch || — || align=right data-sort-value="0.82" | 820 m || 
|-id=446 bgcolor=#E9E9E9
| 231446 Dayao ||  ||  || April 10, 2007 || XuYi || PMO NEO || — || align=right | 2.4 km || 
|-id=447 bgcolor=#E9E9E9
| 231447 ||  || — || April 16, 2007 || Catalina || CSS || — || align=right | 3.7 km || 
|-id=448 bgcolor=#fefefe
| 231448 ||  || — || April 20, 2007 || Anderson Mesa || LONEOS || — || align=right data-sort-value="0.94" | 940 m || 
|-id=449 bgcolor=#E9E9E9
| 231449 ||  || — || April 20, 2007 || Kitt Peak || Spacewatch || — || align=right | 1.2 km || 
|-id=450 bgcolor=#d6d6d6
| 231450 ||  || — || April 23, 2007 || Catalina || CSS || — || align=right | 7.1 km || 
|-id=451 bgcolor=#fefefe
| 231451 ||  || — || April 22, 2007 || Kitt Peak || Spacewatch || — || align=right | 1.1 km || 
|-id=452 bgcolor=#fefefe
| 231452 ||  || — || April 22, 2007 || Catalina || CSS || — || align=right | 1.6 km || 
|-id=453 bgcolor=#fefefe
| 231453 ||  || — || April 16, 2007 || Catalina || CSS || V || align=right data-sort-value="0.93" | 930 m || 
|-id=454 bgcolor=#fefefe
| 231454 ||  || — || April 28, 2007 || Kitt Peak || Spacewatch || FLO || align=right data-sort-value="0.87" | 870 m || 
|-id=455 bgcolor=#E9E9E9
| 231455 ||  || — || May 9, 2007 || Mount Lemmon || Mount Lemmon Survey || PAD || align=right | 3.5 km || 
|-id=456 bgcolor=#fefefe
| 231456 ||  || — || May 10, 2007 || Mount Lemmon || Mount Lemmon Survey || — || align=right data-sort-value="0.90" | 900 m || 
|-id=457 bgcolor=#fefefe
| 231457 ||  || — || May 12, 2007 || Mount Lemmon || Mount Lemmon Survey || — || align=right | 1.1 km || 
|-id=458 bgcolor=#E9E9E9
| 231458 ||  || — || June 14, 2007 || Socorro || LINEAR || ADE || align=right | 4.9 km || 
|-id=459 bgcolor=#fefefe
| 231459 ||  || — || June 14, 2007 || Kitt Peak || Spacewatch || — || align=right | 1.2 km || 
|-id=460 bgcolor=#E9E9E9
| 231460 ||  || — || June 18, 2007 || Kitt Peak || Spacewatch || — || align=right | 1.9 km || 
|-id=461 bgcolor=#fefefe
| 231461 ||  || — || June 22, 2007 || Anderson Mesa || LONEOS || — || align=right | 1.3 km || 
|-id=462 bgcolor=#d6d6d6
| 231462 ||  || — || July 24, 2007 || Tiki || N. Teamo || — || align=right | 4.4 km || 
|-id=463 bgcolor=#d6d6d6
| 231463 || 2007 PO || — || August 5, 2007 || Wrightwood || J. W. Young || — || align=right | 6.3 km || 
|-id=464 bgcolor=#C2FFFF
| 231464 ||  || — || August 7, 2007 || Antares || ARO || L4 || align=right | 11 km || 
|-id=465 bgcolor=#E9E9E9
| 231465 ||  || — || August 7, 2007 || Antares || ARO || MRX || align=right | 1.3 km || 
|-id=466 bgcolor=#E9E9E9
| 231466 ||  || — || August 8, 2007 || Socorro || LINEAR || — || align=right | 2.5 km || 
|-id=467 bgcolor=#d6d6d6
| 231467 ||  || — || August 9, 2007 || Socorro || LINEAR || — || align=right | 6.7 km || 
|-id=468 bgcolor=#d6d6d6
| 231468 ||  || — || August 11, 2007 || Bergisch Gladbach || W. Bickel || EUP || align=right | 6.6 km || 
|-id=469 bgcolor=#E9E9E9
| 231469 ||  || — || August 9, 2007 || Socorro || LINEAR || — || align=right | 4.3 km || 
|-id=470 bgcolor=#d6d6d6
| 231470 Bedding ||  ||  || September 2, 2007 || Siding Spring || K. Sárneczky, L. Kiss || KOR || align=right | 1.8 km || 
|-id=471 bgcolor=#d6d6d6
| 231471 ||  || — || October 13, 2007 || Socorro || LINEAR || 7:4 || align=right | 4.9 km || 
|-id=472 bgcolor=#d6d6d6
| 231472 ||  || — || October 8, 2007 || Kitt Peak || Spacewatch || HYG || align=right | 5.1 km || 
|-id=473 bgcolor=#d6d6d6
| 231473 ||  || — || October 15, 2007 || Lulin Observatory || LUSS || — || align=right | 4.1 km || 
|-id=474 bgcolor=#fefefe
| 231474 ||  || — || October 30, 2007 || Kitt Peak || Spacewatch || NYS || align=right data-sort-value="0.78" | 780 m || 
|-id=475 bgcolor=#d6d6d6
| 231475 ||  || — || November 1, 2007 || Skylive Obs. || F. Tozzi || — || align=right | 4.7 km || 
|-id=476 bgcolor=#E9E9E9
| 231476 ||  || — || November 13, 2007 || Kitt Peak || Spacewatch || — || align=right | 2.5 km || 
|-id=477 bgcolor=#fefefe
| 231477 ||  || — || March 4, 2008 || Kitt Peak || Spacewatch || FLO || align=right data-sort-value="0.85" | 850 m || 
|-id=478 bgcolor=#E9E9E9
| 231478 ||  || — || April 5, 2008 || Catalina || CSS || — || align=right | 2.3 km || 
|-id=479 bgcolor=#E9E9E9
| 231479 ||  || — || April 28, 2008 || Mount Lemmon || Mount Lemmon Survey || — || align=right | 2.4 km || 
|-id=480 bgcolor=#E9E9E9
| 231480 ||  || — || April 30, 2008 || Mount Lemmon || Mount Lemmon Survey || MIS || align=right | 3.4 km || 
|-id=481 bgcolor=#fefefe
| 231481 ||  || — || May 8, 2008 || Mount Lemmon || Mount Lemmon Survey || — || align=right | 1.00 km || 
|-id=482 bgcolor=#fefefe
| 231482 || 2008 KL || — || May 26, 2008 || Grove Creek || F. Tozzi || — || align=right data-sort-value="0.98" | 980 m || 
|-id=483 bgcolor=#d6d6d6
| 231483 ||  || — || July 30, 2008 || Mount Lemmon || Mount Lemmon Survey || — || align=right | 6.2 km || 
|-id=484 bgcolor=#d6d6d6
| 231484 ||  || — || July 25, 2008 || Siding Spring || SSS || — || align=right | 5.9 km || 
|-id=485 bgcolor=#fefefe
| 231485 ||  || — || July 29, 2008 || Kitt Peak || Spacewatch || — || align=right data-sort-value="0.94" | 940 m || 
|-id=486 bgcolor=#fefefe
| 231486 Capefearrock ||  ||  || August 3, 2008 || Antares || R. Holmes, H. Devore || FLO || align=right data-sort-value="0.80" | 800 m || 
|-id=487 bgcolor=#E9E9E9
| 231487 ||  || — || August 3, 2008 || Vicques || M. Ory || — || align=right | 1.6 km || 
|-id=488 bgcolor=#fefefe
| 231488 ||  || — || August 5, 2008 || La Sagra || OAM Obs. || — || align=right | 1.8 km || 
|-id=489 bgcolor=#E9E9E9
| 231489 ||  || — || August 10, 2008 || La Sagra || OAM Obs. || — || align=right data-sort-value="0.95" | 950 m || 
|-id=490 bgcolor=#E9E9E9
| 231490 ||  || — || August 25, 2008 || Hibiscus || S. F. Hönig, N. Teamo || — || align=right | 3.3 km || 
|-id=491 bgcolor=#E9E9E9
| 231491 ||  || — || August 27, 2008 || La Sagra || OAM Obs. || — || align=right | 2.3 km || 
|-id=492 bgcolor=#d6d6d6
| 231492 ||  || — || August 28, 2008 || La Sagra || OAM Obs. || — || align=right | 3.9 km || 
|-id=493 bgcolor=#C2FFFF
| 231493 ||  || — || August 29, 2008 || Dauban || F. Kugel || L4 || align=right | 12 km || 
|-id=494 bgcolor=#E9E9E9
| 231494 ||  || — || August 26, 2008 || La Sagra || OAM Obs. || — || align=right | 4.5 km || 
|-id=495 bgcolor=#E9E9E9
| 231495 ||  || — || August 30, 2008 || La Sagra || OAM Obs. || MRX || align=right | 1.5 km || 
|-id=496 bgcolor=#fefefe
| 231496 ||  || — || August 25, 2008 || La Sagra || OAM Obs. || SUL || align=right | 2.6 km || 
|-id=497 bgcolor=#E9E9E9
| 231497 ||  || — || August 27, 2008 || La Sagra || OAM Obs. || — || align=right | 1.9 km || 
|-id=498 bgcolor=#E9E9E9
| 231498 ||  || — || August 23, 2008 || Siding Spring || SSS || ADE || align=right | 2.5 km || 
|-id=499 bgcolor=#fefefe
| 231499 ||  || — || August 24, 2008 || Kitt Peak || Spacewatch || — || align=right | 1.1 km || 
|-id=500 bgcolor=#d6d6d6
| 231500 ||  || — || August 30, 2008 || Socorro || LINEAR || — || align=right | 4.9 km || 
|}

231501–231600 

|-bgcolor=#d6d6d6
| 231501 ||  || — || August 23, 2008 || Siding Spring || SSS || — || align=right | 3.3 km || 
|-id=502 bgcolor=#E9E9E9
| 231502 ||  || — || September 2, 2008 || Kitt Peak || Spacewatch || HEN || align=right | 1.6 km || 
|-id=503 bgcolor=#d6d6d6
| 231503 ||  || — || September 3, 2008 || Kitt Peak || Spacewatch || HYG || align=right | 3.0 km || 
|-id=504 bgcolor=#d6d6d6
| 231504 ||  || — || September 4, 2008 || Kitt Peak || Spacewatch || — || align=right | 3.7 km || 
|-id=505 bgcolor=#E9E9E9
| 231505 ||  || — || September 2, 2008 || Kitt Peak || Spacewatch || AGN || align=right | 1.7 km || 
|-id=506 bgcolor=#E9E9E9
| 231506 ||  || — || September 2, 2008 || Kitt Peak || Spacewatch || — || align=right | 1.2 km || 
|-id=507 bgcolor=#d6d6d6
| 231507 ||  || — || September 2, 2008 || Kitt Peak || Spacewatch || KOR || align=right | 1.9 km || 
|-id=508 bgcolor=#fefefe
| 231508 ||  || — || September 3, 2008 || Kitt Peak || Spacewatch || — || align=right data-sort-value="0.93" | 930 m || 
|-id=509 bgcolor=#C2FFFF
| 231509 ||  || — || September 5, 2008 || Kitt Peak || Spacewatch || L4 || align=right | 13 km || 
|-id=510 bgcolor=#E9E9E9
| 231510 ||  || — || September 4, 2008 || Kitt Peak || Spacewatch || — || align=right | 2.3 km || 
|-id=511 bgcolor=#d6d6d6
| 231511 ||  || — || September 3, 2008 || Kitt Peak || Spacewatch || — || align=right | 3.1 km || 
|-id=512 bgcolor=#d6d6d6
| 231512 ||  || — || September 1, 2008 || Siding Spring || SSS || — || align=right | 4.8 km || 
|-id=513 bgcolor=#d6d6d6
| 231513 ||  || — || September 5, 2008 || Kitt Peak || Spacewatch || CHA || align=right | 2.8 km || 
|-id=514 bgcolor=#d6d6d6
| 231514 ||  || — || September 6, 2008 || Mount Lemmon || Mount Lemmon Survey || THM || align=right | 3.3 km || 
|-id=515 bgcolor=#E9E9E9
| 231515 ||  || — || September 8, 2008 || Catalina || CSS || — || align=right | 3.3 km || 
|-id=516 bgcolor=#C2FFFF
| 231516 ||  || — || September 6, 2008 || Mount Lemmon || Mount Lemmon Survey || L4 || align=right | 12 km || 
|-id=517 bgcolor=#E9E9E9
| 231517 ||  || — || September 19, 2008 || Kitt Peak || Spacewatch || — || align=right | 4.2 km || 
|-id=518 bgcolor=#E9E9E9
| 231518 ||  || — || September 20, 2008 || Mount Lemmon || Mount Lemmon Survey || — || align=right | 1.9 km || 
|-id=519 bgcolor=#d6d6d6
| 231519 ||  || — || September 20, 2008 || Kitt Peak || Spacewatch || THM || align=right | 3.0 km || 
|-id=520 bgcolor=#E9E9E9
| 231520 ||  || — || September 20, 2008 || Kitt Peak || Spacewatch || HOF || align=right | 3.4 km || 
|-id=521 bgcolor=#d6d6d6
| 231521 ||  || — || September 20, 2008 || Mount Lemmon || Mount Lemmon Survey || THM || align=right | 2.9 km || 
|-id=522 bgcolor=#E9E9E9
| 231522 ||  || — || September 20, 2008 || Kitt Peak || Spacewatch || — || align=right | 1.6 km || 
|-id=523 bgcolor=#E9E9E9
| 231523 ||  || — || September 20, 2008 || Kitt Peak || Spacewatch || — || align=right | 1.4 km || 
|-id=524 bgcolor=#E9E9E9
| 231524 ||  || — || September 20, 2008 || Kitt Peak || Spacewatch || — || align=right | 1.9 km || 
|-id=525 bgcolor=#E9E9E9
| 231525 ||  || — || September 25, 2008 || Kachina || J. Hobart || — || align=right | 2.9 km || 
|-id=526 bgcolor=#E9E9E9
| 231526 ||  || — || September 26, 2008 || Sierra Stars || F. Tozzi || EUN || align=right | 1.9 km || 
|-id=527 bgcolor=#d6d6d6
| 231527 ||  || — || September 28, 2008 || Prairie Grass || J. Mahony || — || align=right | 5.1 km || 
|-id=528 bgcolor=#d6d6d6
| 231528 ||  || — || September 21, 2008 || Kitt Peak || Spacewatch || KOR || align=right | 1.6 km || 
|-id=529 bgcolor=#d6d6d6
| 231529 ||  || — || September 21, 2008 || Kitt Peak || Spacewatch || KOR || align=right | 1.8 km || 
|-id=530 bgcolor=#d6d6d6
| 231530 ||  || — || September 21, 2008 || Kitt Peak || Spacewatch || KOR || align=right | 1.8 km || 
|-id=531 bgcolor=#E9E9E9
| 231531 ||  || — || September 21, 2008 || Kitt Peak || Spacewatch || — || align=right | 2.6 km || 
|-id=532 bgcolor=#d6d6d6
| 231532 ||  || — || September 22, 2008 || Kitt Peak || Spacewatch || — || align=right | 2.5 km || 
|-id=533 bgcolor=#E9E9E9
| 231533 ||  || — || September 22, 2008 || Kitt Peak || Spacewatch || PAD || align=right | 2.6 km || 
|-id=534 bgcolor=#E9E9E9
| 231534 ||  || — || September 23, 2008 || Kitt Peak || Spacewatch || — || align=right | 1.6 km || 
|-id=535 bgcolor=#E9E9E9
| 231535 ||  || — || September 25, 2008 || Junk Bond || D. Healy || — || align=right | 2.4 km || 
|-id=536 bgcolor=#d6d6d6
| 231536 ||  || — || September 24, 2008 || Socorro || LINEAR || — || align=right | 2.6 km || 
|-id=537 bgcolor=#d6d6d6
| 231537 ||  || — || September 28, 2008 || Socorro || LINEAR || THM || align=right | 3.4 km || 
|-id=538 bgcolor=#d6d6d6
| 231538 ||  || — || September 28, 2008 || Socorro || LINEAR || K-2 || align=right | 2.6 km || 
|-id=539 bgcolor=#d6d6d6
| 231539 ||  || — || September 28, 2008 || Socorro || LINEAR || — || align=right | 5.3 km || 
|-id=540 bgcolor=#d6d6d6
| 231540 ||  || — || September 22, 2008 || Catalina || CSS || — || align=right | 4.7 km || 
|-id=541 bgcolor=#d6d6d6
| 231541 ||  || — || September 22, 2008 || Kitt Peak || Spacewatch || KAR || align=right | 1.3 km || 
|-id=542 bgcolor=#d6d6d6
| 231542 ||  || — || September 24, 2008 || Kitt Peak || Spacewatch || — || align=right | 3.3 km || 
|-id=543 bgcolor=#E9E9E9
| 231543 ||  || — || September 30, 2008 || La Sagra || OAM Obs. || AGN || align=right | 1.7 km || 
|-id=544 bgcolor=#d6d6d6
| 231544 ||  || — || September 30, 2008 || La Sagra || OAM Obs. || HYG || align=right | 3.2 km || 
|-id=545 bgcolor=#E9E9E9
| 231545 ||  || — || September 29, 2008 || Catalina || CSS || WIT || align=right | 1.3 km || 
|-id=546 bgcolor=#E9E9E9
| 231546 ||  || — || September 29, 2008 || Catalina || CSS || WIT || align=right | 1.6 km || 
|-id=547 bgcolor=#E9E9E9
| 231547 ||  || — || September 29, 2008 || Catalina || CSS || HOF || align=right | 4.1 km || 
|-id=548 bgcolor=#E9E9E9
| 231548 ||  || — || September 20, 2008 || Kitt Peak || Spacewatch || — || align=right | 3.1 km || 
|-id=549 bgcolor=#E9E9E9
| 231549 ||  || — || September 22, 2008 || Catalina || CSS || — || align=right | 4.0 km || 
|-id=550 bgcolor=#E9E9E9
| 231550 ||  || — || September 23, 2008 || Kitt Peak || Spacewatch || DOR || align=right | 3.9 km || 
|-id=551 bgcolor=#d6d6d6
| 231551 ||  || — || September 23, 2008 || Kitt Peak || Spacewatch || — || align=right | 5.4 km || 
|-id=552 bgcolor=#d6d6d6
| 231552 ||  || — || September 30, 2008 || Catalina || CSS || — || align=right | 3.8 km || 
|-id=553 bgcolor=#E9E9E9
| 231553 ||  || — || September 21, 2008 || Kitt Peak || Spacewatch || — || align=right | 2.4 km || 
|-id=554 bgcolor=#fefefe
| 231554 ||  || — || September 29, 2008 || Catalina || CSS || V || align=right data-sort-value="0.92" | 920 m || 
|-id=555 bgcolor=#d6d6d6
| 231555 Christianeurda ||  ||  || October 1, 2008 || Bergen-Enkheim || U. Süßenberger || — || align=right | 4.6 km || 
|-id=556 bgcolor=#E9E9E9
| 231556 ||  || — || October 1, 2008 || La Sagra || OAM Obs. || HOF || align=right | 3.5 km || 
|-id=557 bgcolor=#d6d6d6
| 231557 ||  || — || October 1, 2008 || La Sagra || OAM Obs. || — || align=right | 4.6 km || 
|-id=558 bgcolor=#d6d6d6
| 231558 ||  || — || October 1, 2008 || Mount Lemmon || Mount Lemmon Survey || — || align=right | 3.1 km || 
|-id=559 bgcolor=#E9E9E9
| 231559 ||  || — || October 1, 2008 || Kitt Peak || Spacewatch || — || align=right | 3.9 km || 
|-id=560 bgcolor=#d6d6d6
| 231560 ||  || — || October 2, 2008 || Kitt Peak || Spacewatch || KOR || align=right | 1.6 km || 
|-id=561 bgcolor=#d6d6d6
| 231561 ||  || — || October 2, 2008 || Kitt Peak || Spacewatch || — || align=right | 3.9 km || 
|-id=562 bgcolor=#d6d6d6
| 231562 ||  || — || October 2, 2008 || Kitt Peak || Spacewatch || — || align=right | 3.2 km || 
|-id=563 bgcolor=#E9E9E9
| 231563 ||  || — || October 2, 2008 || Kitt Peak || Spacewatch || — || align=right | 2.4 km || 
|-id=564 bgcolor=#E9E9E9
| 231564 ||  || — || October 2, 2008 || Kitt Peak || Spacewatch || — || align=right | 3.0 km || 
|-id=565 bgcolor=#d6d6d6
| 231565 ||  || — || October 8, 2008 || Mount Lemmon || Mount Lemmon Survey || — || align=right | 3.3 km || 
|-id=566 bgcolor=#d6d6d6
| 231566 ||  || — || October 9, 2008 || Mount Lemmon || Mount Lemmon Survey || — || align=right | 3.6 km || 
|-id=567 bgcolor=#d6d6d6
| 231567 ||  || — || October 1, 2008 || Kitt Peak || Spacewatch || KOR || align=right | 1.7 km || 
|-id=568 bgcolor=#E9E9E9
| 231568 ||  || — || October 1, 2008 || Catalina || CSS || — || align=right | 2.3 km || 
|-id=569 bgcolor=#E9E9E9
| 231569 ||  || — || October 6, 2008 || La Sagra || OAM Obs. || — || align=right | 2.6 km || 
|-id=570 bgcolor=#d6d6d6
| 231570 ||  || — || October 2, 2008 || Catalina || CSS || — || align=right | 5.3 km || 
|-id=571 bgcolor=#d6d6d6
| 231571 ||  || — || October 22, 2008 || Piszkéstető || K. Sárneczky, Á. Kárpáti || KOR || align=right | 1.6 km || 
|-id=572 bgcolor=#C2FFFF
| 231572 ||  || — || October 17, 2008 || Kitt Peak || Spacewatch || L4 || align=right | 11 km || 
|-id=573 bgcolor=#E9E9E9
| 231573 ||  || — || October 20, 2008 || Kitt Peak || Spacewatch || — || align=right | 3.0 km || 
|-id=574 bgcolor=#d6d6d6
| 231574 ||  || — || October 21, 2008 || Kitt Peak || Spacewatch || — || align=right | 3.4 km || 
|-id=575 bgcolor=#fefefe
| 231575 ||  || — || October 21, 2008 || Kitt Peak || Spacewatch || MAS || align=right | 1.3 km || 
|-id=576 bgcolor=#E9E9E9
| 231576 ||  || — || October 21, 2008 || Mount Lemmon || Mount Lemmon Survey || — || align=right | 3.4 km || 
|-id=577 bgcolor=#E9E9E9
| 231577 ||  || — || October 28, 2008 || Socorro || LINEAR || — || align=right | 2.7 km || 
|-id=578 bgcolor=#d6d6d6
| 231578 ||  || — || October 23, 2008 || Mount Lemmon || Mount Lemmon Survey || — || align=right | 3.1 km || 
|-id=579 bgcolor=#d6d6d6
| 231579 ||  || — || October 24, 2008 || Catalina || CSS || — || align=right | 4.8 km || 
|-id=580 bgcolor=#d6d6d6
| 231580 ||  || — || October 24, 2008 || Mount Lemmon || Mount Lemmon Survey || — || align=right | 3.2 km || 
|-id=581 bgcolor=#d6d6d6
| 231581 ||  || — || October 27, 2008 || Kitt Peak || Spacewatch || — || align=right | 3.7 km || 
|-id=582 bgcolor=#d6d6d6
| 231582 ||  || — || October 25, 2008 || Kitt Peak || Spacewatch || KOR || align=right | 1.8 km || 
|-id=583 bgcolor=#d6d6d6
| 231583 ||  || — || October 25, 2008 || Kitt Peak || Spacewatch || — || align=right | 3.9 km || 
|-id=584 bgcolor=#d6d6d6
| 231584 ||  || — || October 27, 2008 || Kitt Peak || Spacewatch || — || align=right | 3.3 km || 
|-id=585 bgcolor=#d6d6d6
| 231585 ||  || — || October 27, 2008 || Kitt Peak || Spacewatch || K-2 || align=right | 1.7 km || 
|-id=586 bgcolor=#d6d6d6
| 231586 ||  || — || October 28, 2008 || Kitt Peak || Spacewatch || HYG || align=right | 3.4 km || 
|-id=587 bgcolor=#d6d6d6
| 231587 ||  || — || October 28, 2008 || Kitt Peak || Spacewatch || — || align=right | 3.9 km || 
|-id=588 bgcolor=#E9E9E9
| 231588 ||  || — || October 28, 2008 || Mount Lemmon || Mount Lemmon Survey || — || align=right | 1.3 km || 
|-id=589 bgcolor=#d6d6d6
| 231589 ||  || — || October 30, 2008 || Kitt Peak || Spacewatch || — || align=right | 7.3 km || 
|-id=590 bgcolor=#d6d6d6
| 231590 ||  || — || October 30, 2008 || Mount Lemmon || Mount Lemmon Survey || CHA || align=right | 2.8 km || 
|-id=591 bgcolor=#d6d6d6
| 231591 ||  || — || October 23, 2008 || Kitt Peak || Spacewatch || — || align=right | 3.3 km || 
|-id=592 bgcolor=#fefefe
| 231592 ||  || — || October 24, 2008 || Mount Lemmon || Mount Lemmon Survey || NYS || align=right data-sort-value="0.99" | 990 m || 
|-id=593 bgcolor=#d6d6d6
| 231593 ||  || — || October 20, 2008 || Mount Lemmon || Mount Lemmon Survey || THM || align=right | 3.4 km || 
|-id=594 bgcolor=#d6d6d6
| 231594 ||  || — || October 26, 2008 || Catalina || CSS || — || align=right | 5.5 km || 
|-id=595 bgcolor=#E9E9E9
| 231595 ||  || — || November 6, 2008 || Kitt Peak || Spacewatch || MRX || align=right | 1.5 km || 
|-id=596 bgcolor=#E9E9E9
| 231596 || 2008 WQ || — || November 17, 2008 || Kitt Peak || Spacewatch || — || align=right | 2.4 km || 
|-id=597 bgcolor=#d6d6d6
| 231597 ||  || — || November 17, 2008 || Kitt Peak || Spacewatch || THM || align=right | 3.2 km || 
|-id=598 bgcolor=#E9E9E9
| 231598 ||  || — || December 30, 2008 || Kitt Peak || Spacewatch || — || align=right | 2.2 km || 
|-id=599 bgcolor=#E9E9E9
| 231599 ||  || — || December 21, 2008 || Kitt Peak || Spacewatch || — || align=right | 2.9 km || 
|-id=600 bgcolor=#fefefe
| 231600 ||  || — || January 2, 2009 || Kitt Peak || Spacewatch || V || align=right data-sort-value="0.98" | 980 m || 
|}

231601–231700 

|-bgcolor=#fefefe
| 231601 ||  || — || January 25, 2009 || Kitt Peak || Spacewatch || MAS || align=right | 1.0 km || 
|-id=602 bgcolor=#fefefe
| 231602 ||  || — || January 31, 2009 || Mount Lemmon || Mount Lemmon Survey || — || align=right | 1.1 km || 
|-id=603 bgcolor=#fefefe
| 231603 ||  || — || February 1, 2009 || Kitt Peak || Spacewatch || NYS || align=right data-sort-value="0.96" | 960 m || 
|-id=604 bgcolor=#fefefe
| 231604 ||  || — || March 31, 2009 || Kitt Peak || Spacewatch || — || align=right data-sort-value="0.94" | 940 m || 
|-id=605 bgcolor=#E9E9E9
| 231605 ||  || — || April 21, 2009 || Socorro || LINEAR || — || align=right | 1.6 km || 
|-id=606 bgcolor=#d6d6d6
| 231606 ||  || — || April 22, 2009 || Mount Lemmon || Mount Lemmon Survey || EMA || align=right | 5.1 km || 
|-id=607 bgcolor=#fefefe
| 231607 ||  || — || May 15, 2009 || La Sagra || OAM Obs. || — || align=right | 1.1 km || 
|-id=608 bgcolor=#fefefe
| 231608 ||  || — || August 17, 2009 || Catalina || CSS || V || align=right data-sort-value="0.70" | 700 m || 
|-id=609 bgcolor=#d6d6d6
| 231609 Sarcander || 2009 RV ||  || September 10, 2009 || ESA OGS || ESA OGS || — || align=right | 3.2 km || 
|-id=610 bgcolor=#C2FFFF
| 231610 ||  || — || September 12, 2009 || Kitt Peak || Spacewatch || L4 || align=right | 8.0 km || 
|-id=611 bgcolor=#d6d6d6
| 231611 ||  || — || September 14, 2009 || Kitt Peak || Spacewatch || — || align=right | 2.9 km || 
|-id=612 bgcolor=#C2FFFF
| 231612 ||  || — || September 15, 2009 || Kitt Peak || Spacewatch || L4 || align=right | 11 km || 
|-id=613 bgcolor=#C2FFFF
| 231613 ||  || — || September 16, 2009 || Kitt Peak || Spacewatch || L4 || align=right | 14 km || 
|-id=614 bgcolor=#fefefe
| 231614 ||  || — || September 16, 2009 || Kitt Peak || Spacewatch || — || align=right data-sort-value="0.99" | 990 m || 
|-id=615 bgcolor=#C2FFFF
| 231615 ||  || — || September 18, 2009 || Kitt Peak || Spacewatch || L4 || align=right | 15 km || 
|-id=616 bgcolor=#fefefe
| 231616 ||  || — || September 19, 2009 || Mount Lemmon || Mount Lemmon Survey || — || align=right data-sort-value="0.85" | 850 m || 
|-id=617 bgcolor=#FA8072
| 231617 ||  || — || September 24, 2009 || La Sagra || OAM Obs. || H || align=right data-sort-value="0.81" | 810 m || 
|-id=618 bgcolor=#fefefe
| 231618 ||  || — || September 25, 2009 || Taunus || S. Karge, R. Kling || — || align=right data-sort-value="0.95" | 950 m || 
|-id=619 bgcolor=#fefefe
| 231619 ||  || — || September 16, 2009 || Mount Lemmon || Mount Lemmon Survey || — || align=right data-sort-value="0.86" | 860 m || 
|-id=620 bgcolor=#C2FFFF
| 231620 ||  || — || September 18, 2009 || Kitt Peak || Spacewatch || L4 || align=right | 10 km || 
|-id=621 bgcolor=#C2FFFF
| 231621 ||  || — || September 18, 2009 || Kitt Peak || Spacewatch || L4 || align=right | 10 km || 
|-id=622 bgcolor=#E9E9E9
| 231622 ||  || — || September 20, 2009 || Kitt Peak || Spacewatch || — || align=right | 3.0 km || 
|-id=623 bgcolor=#C2FFFF
| 231623 ||  || — || September 23, 2009 || Kitt Peak || Spacewatch || L4HEK || align=right | 14 km || 
|-id=624 bgcolor=#fefefe
| 231624 ||  || — || September 19, 2009 || Catalina || CSS || — || align=right | 1.2 km || 
|-id=625 bgcolor=#d6d6d6
| 231625 ||  || — || September 20, 2009 || Catalina || CSS || EUP || align=right | 6.7 km || 
|-id=626 bgcolor=#E9E9E9
| 231626 ||  || — || September 21, 2009 || Kitt Peak || Spacewatch || — || align=right | 4.0 km || 
|-id=627 bgcolor=#fefefe
| 231627 ||  || — || September 19, 2009 || Mount Lemmon || Mount Lemmon Survey || — || align=right | 1.1 km || 
|-id=628 bgcolor=#d6d6d6
| 231628 ||  || — || September 17, 2009 || Kitt Peak || Spacewatch || — || align=right | 2.7 km || 
|-id=629 bgcolor=#E9E9E9
| 231629 ||  || — || October 14, 2009 || Bisei SG Center || BATTeRS || — || align=right | 2.2 km || 
|-id=630 bgcolor=#d6d6d6
| 231630 ||  || — || October 14, 2009 || Catalina || CSS || — || align=right | 4.3 km || 
|-id=631 bgcolor=#C2FFFF
| 231631 ||  || — || October 12, 2009 || La Sagra || OAM Obs. || L4 || align=right | 14 km || 
|-id=632 bgcolor=#d6d6d6
| 231632 ||  || — || October 17, 2009 || Mount Lemmon || Mount Lemmon Survey || — || align=right | 3.8 km || 
|-id=633 bgcolor=#d6d6d6
| 231633 ||  || — || October 21, 2009 || Catalina || CSS || — || align=right | 4.5 km || 
|-id=634 bgcolor=#d6d6d6
| 231634 ||  || — || October 22, 2009 || Mount Lemmon || Mount Lemmon Survey || EOS || align=right | 3.2 km || 
|-id=635 bgcolor=#E9E9E9
| 231635 ||  || — || October 23, 2009 || Kitt Peak || Spacewatch || — || align=right | 2.5 km || 
|-id=636 bgcolor=#C2FFFF
| 231636 ||  || — || October 23, 2009 || Mount Lemmon || Mount Lemmon Survey || L4 || align=right | 11 km || 
|-id=637 bgcolor=#d6d6d6
| 231637 ||  || — || October 21, 2009 || Catalina || CSS || — || align=right | 3.0 km || 
|-id=638 bgcolor=#d6d6d6
| 231638 ||  || — || October 24, 2009 || Catalina || CSS || — || align=right | 4.4 km || 
|-id=639 bgcolor=#E9E9E9
| 231639 ||  || — || October 22, 2009 || Catalina || CSS || — || align=right | 4.8 km || 
|-id=640 bgcolor=#fefefe
| 231640 ||  || — || October 24, 2009 || Catalina || CSS || FLO || align=right data-sort-value="0.75" | 750 m || 
|-id=641 bgcolor=#fefefe
| 231641 ||  || — || October 18, 2009 || Siding Spring || SSS || PHO || align=right | 1.6 km || 
|-id=642 bgcolor=#E9E9E9
| 231642 ||  || — || October 30, 2009 || Mount Lemmon || Mount Lemmon Survey || — || align=right | 3.3 km || 
|-id=643 bgcolor=#E9E9E9
| 231643 ||  || — || November 9, 2009 || Socorro || LINEAR || — || align=right | 1.5 km || 
|-id=644 bgcolor=#E9E9E9
| 231644 ||  || — || November 8, 2009 || Kitt Peak || Spacewatch || — || align=right | 1.3 km || 
|-id=645 bgcolor=#d6d6d6
| 231645 ||  || — || November 10, 2009 || Kitt Peak || Spacewatch || CHA || align=right | 2.6 km || 
|-id=646 bgcolor=#d6d6d6
| 231646 ||  || — || November 10, 2009 || Kitt Peak || Spacewatch || EOS || align=right | 2.6 km || 
|-id=647 bgcolor=#d6d6d6
| 231647 ||  || — || November 9, 2009 || Kitt Peak || Spacewatch || — || align=right | 4.4 km || 
|-id=648 bgcolor=#d6d6d6
| 231648 ||  || — || November 8, 2009 || Kitt Peak || Spacewatch || — || align=right | 3.2 km || 
|-id=649 bgcolor=#E9E9E9
| 231649 Korotkiy ||  ||  || November 17, 2009 || Tzec Maun || A. Novichonok, D. Chestnov || — || align=right | 2.4 km || 
|-id=650 bgcolor=#E9E9E9
| 231650 ||  || — || November 18, 2009 || Socorro || LINEAR || — || align=right | 2.9 km || 
|-id=651 bgcolor=#fefefe
| 231651 ||  || — || November 18, 2009 || Socorro || LINEAR || — || align=right | 1.1 km || 
|-id=652 bgcolor=#fefefe
| 231652 ||  || — || November 18, 2009 || Socorro || LINEAR || — || align=right | 1.2 km || 
|-id=653 bgcolor=#E9E9E9
| 231653 ||  || — || November 18, 2009 || Socorro || LINEAR || — || align=right | 1.2 km || 
|-id=654 bgcolor=#d6d6d6
| 231654 ||  || — || November 21, 2009 || Kitt Peak || Spacewatch || — || align=right | 3.5 km || 
|-id=655 bgcolor=#d6d6d6
| 231655 ||  || — || November 21, 2009 || Kitt Peak || Spacewatch || HYG || align=right | 4.1 km || 
|-id=656 bgcolor=#d6d6d6
| 231656 ||  || — || November 21, 2009 || Kitt Peak || Spacewatch || KOR || align=right | 1.7 km || 
|-id=657 bgcolor=#d6d6d6
| 231657 ||  || — || November 21, 2009 || Kitt Peak || Spacewatch || — || align=right | 3.8 km || 
|-id=658 bgcolor=#fefefe
| 231658 ||  || — || November 23, 2009 || Mount Lemmon || Mount Lemmon Survey || — || align=right data-sort-value="0.88" | 880 m || 
|-id=659 bgcolor=#d6d6d6
| 231659 ||  || — || November 16, 2009 || La Sagra || OAM Obs. || — || align=right | 4.4 km || 
|-id=660 bgcolor=#fefefe
| 231660 ||  || — || December 11, 2009 || Mayhill || iTelescope Obs. || FLO || align=right | 1.3 km || 
|-id=661 bgcolor=#d6d6d6
| 231661 ||  || — || December 15, 2009 || Mount Lemmon || Mount Lemmon Survey || — || align=right | 4.4 km || 
|-id=662 bgcolor=#E9E9E9
| 231662 ||  || — || December 10, 2009 || Mount Lemmon || Mount Lemmon Survey || — || align=right | 4.5 km || 
|-id=663 bgcolor=#d6d6d6
| 231663 ||  || — || December 9, 2009 || La Sagra || OAM Obs. || — || align=right | 5.2 km || 
|-id=664 bgcolor=#C2FFFF
| 231664 ||  || — || December 20, 2009 || Mount Lemmon || Mount Lemmon Survey || L4 || align=right | 13 km || 
|-id=665 bgcolor=#d6d6d6
| 231665 || 7602 P-L || — || October 17, 1960 || Palomar || PLS || — || align=right | 3.5 km || 
|-id=666 bgcolor=#C2FFFF
| 231666 Aisymnos ||  ||  || September 24, 1960 || Palomar || L. D. Schmadel, R. M. Stoss || L4 || align=right | 13 km || 
|-id=667 bgcolor=#fefefe
| 231667 ||  || — || March 7, 1981 || Siding Spring || S. J. Bus || — || align=right | 1.1 km || 
|-id=668 bgcolor=#E9E9E9
| 231668 ||  || — || March 6, 1981 || Siding Spring || S. J. Bus || — || align=right | 4.0 km || 
|-id=669 bgcolor=#E9E9E9
| 231669 ||  || — || March 19, 1993 || La Silla || UESAC || GER || align=right | 2.2 km || 
|-id=670 bgcolor=#d6d6d6
| 231670 ||  || — || October 20, 1993 || La Silla || E. W. Elst || — || align=right | 3.6 km || 
|-id=671 bgcolor=#d6d6d6
| 231671 ||  || — || January 8, 1994 || Kitt Peak || Spacewatch || — || align=right | 3.6 km || 
|-id=672 bgcolor=#E9E9E9
| 231672 ||  || — || March 5, 1994 || Kitt Peak || Spacewatch || — || align=right | 1.9 km || 
|-id=673 bgcolor=#d6d6d6
| 231673 ||  || — || June 3, 1994 || La Silla || H. Debehogne || — || align=right | 2.5 km || 
|-id=674 bgcolor=#E9E9E9
| 231674 ||  || — || August 10, 1994 || La Silla || E. W. Elst || — || align=right | 2.1 km || 
|-id=675 bgcolor=#fefefe
| 231675 ||  || — || September 12, 1994 || Kitt Peak || Spacewatch || FLO || align=right data-sort-value="0.88" | 880 m || 
|-id=676 bgcolor=#fefefe
| 231676 ||  || — || January 29, 1995 || Kitt Peak || Spacewatch || MAS || align=right | 1.1 km || 
|-id=677 bgcolor=#fefefe
| 231677 ||  || — || March 31, 1995 || Kitt Peak || Spacewatch || MAS || align=right data-sort-value="0.99" | 990 m || 
|-id=678 bgcolor=#fefefe
| 231678 ||  || — || August 19, 1995 || Xinglong || SCAP || FLO || align=right data-sort-value="0.83" | 830 m || 
|-id=679 bgcolor=#d6d6d6
| 231679 ||  || — || August 19, 1995 || Xinglong || SCAP || HYG || align=right | 3.5 km || 
|-id=680 bgcolor=#E9E9E9
| 231680 ||  || — || September 17, 1995 || Kitt Peak || Spacewatch || — || align=right | 2.3 km || 
|-id=681 bgcolor=#d6d6d6
| 231681 ||  || — || September 25, 1995 || Kitt Peak || Spacewatch || — || align=right | 3.7 km || 
|-id=682 bgcolor=#E9E9E9
| 231682 ||  || — || October 17, 1995 || Kitt Peak || Spacewatch || MIS || align=right | 2.8 km || 
|-id=683 bgcolor=#fefefe
| 231683 ||  || — || October 18, 1995 || Kitt Peak || Spacewatch || — || align=right data-sort-value="0.75" | 750 m || 
|-id=684 bgcolor=#E9E9E9
| 231684 ||  || — || January 19, 1996 || Kitt Peak || Spacewatch || — || align=right | 3.3 km || 
|-id=685 bgcolor=#d6d6d6
| 231685 ||  || — || April 11, 1996 || Kitt Peak || Spacewatch || CHA || align=right | 3.0 km || 
|-id=686 bgcolor=#d6d6d6
| 231686 ||  || — || October 4, 1996 || Kitt Peak || Spacewatch || URS || align=right | 5.0 km || 
|-id=687 bgcolor=#fefefe
| 231687 ||  || — || October 12, 1996 || Kitt Peak || Spacewatch || — || align=right | 1.6 km || 
|-id=688 bgcolor=#E9E9E9
| 231688 ||  || — || November 7, 1996 || Prescott || P. G. Comba || — || align=right | 1.2 km || 
|-id=689 bgcolor=#E9E9E9
| 231689 ||  || — || November 14, 1996 || Kitt Peak || Spacewatch || — || align=right | 1.1 km || 
|-id=690 bgcolor=#E9E9E9
| 231690 ||  || — || April 8, 1997 || Kitt Peak || Spacewatch || PAD || align=right | 1.9 km || 
|-id=691 bgcolor=#d6d6d6
| 231691 ||  || — || September 3, 1997 || Caussols || ODAS || — || align=right | 3.5 km || 
|-id=692 bgcolor=#C2FFFF
| 231692 ||  || — || November 22, 1997 || Kitt Peak || Spacewatch || L4 || align=right | 13 km || 
|-id=693 bgcolor=#E9E9E9
| 231693 ||  || — || February 27, 1998 || La Silla || E. W. Elst || MIT || align=right | 3.8 km || 
|-id=694 bgcolor=#E9E9E9
| 231694 ||  || — || April 22, 1998 || Kitt Peak || Spacewatch || — || align=right | 1.5 km || 
|-id=695 bgcolor=#E9E9E9
| 231695 ||  || — || April 24, 1998 || Kitt Peak || Spacewatch || — || align=right | 1.5 km || 
|-id=696 bgcolor=#E9E9E9
| 231696 ||  || — || April 18, 1998 || Socorro || LINEAR || ADE || align=right | 4.3 km || 
|-id=697 bgcolor=#E9E9E9
| 231697 ||  || — || June 25, 1998 || Kitt Peak || Spacewatch || — || align=right | 2.7 km || 
|-id=698 bgcolor=#E9E9E9
| 231698 ||  || — || August 19, 1998 || Kleť || M. Tichý, Z. Moravec || — || align=right | 5.1 km || 
|-id=699 bgcolor=#fefefe
| 231699 ||  || — || August 24, 1998 || Socorro || LINEAR || — || align=right | 3.2 km || 
|-id=700 bgcolor=#FA8072
| 231700 ||  || — || September 23, 1998 || Catalina || CSS || — || align=right | 1.5 km || 
|}

231701–231800 

|-bgcolor=#fefefe
| 231701 ||  || — || September 21, 1998 || Kitt Peak || Spacewatch || — || align=right data-sort-value="0.83" | 830 m || 
|-id=702 bgcolor=#fefefe
| 231702 ||  || — || September 25, 1998 || Kitt Peak || Spacewatch || FLO || align=right data-sort-value="0.88" | 880 m || 
|-id=703 bgcolor=#E9E9E9
| 231703 ||  || — || September 25, 1998 || Kitt Peak || Spacewatch || AGN || align=right | 1.7 km || 
|-id=704 bgcolor=#fefefe
| 231704 ||  || — || September 26, 1998 || Socorro || LINEAR || — || align=right | 1.1 km || 
|-id=705 bgcolor=#d6d6d6
| 231705 ||  || — || September 26, 1998 || Socorro || LINEAR || — || align=right | 5.1 km || 
|-id=706 bgcolor=#d6d6d6
| 231706 ||  || — || September 26, 1998 || Socorro || LINEAR || BRA || align=right | 2.5 km || 
|-id=707 bgcolor=#fefefe
| 231707 || 1998 TP || — || October 10, 1998 || Goodricke-Pigott || R. A. Tucker || PHO || align=right | 2.1 km || 
|-id=708 bgcolor=#d6d6d6
| 231708 ||  || — || October 17, 1998 || Kitt Peak || Spacewatch || — || align=right | 2.2 km || 
|-id=709 bgcolor=#fefefe
| 231709 ||  || — || October 28, 1998 || Socorro || LINEAR || — || align=right | 1.3 km || 
|-id=710 bgcolor=#d6d6d6
| 231710 ||  || — || October 28, 1998 || Socorro || LINEAR || — || align=right | 3.3 km || 
|-id=711 bgcolor=#fefefe
| 231711 ||  || — || November 11, 1998 || Anderson Mesa || LONEOS || — || align=right | 1.3 km || 
|-id=712 bgcolor=#E9E9E9
| 231712 ||  || — || November 19, 1998 || Catalina || CSS || BRU || align=right | 5.3 km || 
|-id=713 bgcolor=#fefefe
| 231713 ||  || — || December 25, 1998 || Kitt Peak || Spacewatch || — || align=right | 2.5 km || 
|-id=714 bgcolor=#d6d6d6
| 231714 ||  || — || January 7, 1999 || Kitt Peak || Spacewatch || — || align=right | 4.9 km || 
|-id=715 bgcolor=#fefefe
| 231715 ||  || — || January 8, 1999 || Kitt Peak || Spacewatch || MAS || align=right data-sort-value="0.80" | 800 m || 
|-id=716 bgcolor=#FA8072
| 231716 ||  || — || January 18, 1999 || Oizumi || T. Kobayashi || — || align=right | 2.5 km || 
|-id=717 bgcolor=#d6d6d6
| 231717 ||  || — || February 12, 1999 || Oohira || T. Urata || — || align=right | 2.4 km || 
|-id=718 bgcolor=#fefefe
| 231718 ||  || — || February 12, 1999 || Socorro || LINEAR || H || align=right data-sort-value="0.94" | 940 m || 
|-id=719 bgcolor=#fefefe
| 231719 ||  || — || February 10, 1999 || Socorro || LINEAR || — || align=right | 1.7 km || 
|-id=720 bgcolor=#d6d6d6
| 231720 ||  || — || February 12, 1999 || Socorro || LINEAR || — || align=right | 3.4 km || 
|-id=721 bgcolor=#d6d6d6
| 231721 ||  || — || February 12, 1999 || Socorro || LINEAR || — || align=right | 4.7 km || 
|-id=722 bgcolor=#d6d6d6
| 231722 ||  || — || February 12, 1999 || Socorro || LINEAR || — || align=right | 3.7 km || 
|-id=723 bgcolor=#d6d6d6
| 231723 ||  || — || February 9, 1999 || Kitt Peak || Spacewatch || THM || align=right | 2.6 km || 
|-id=724 bgcolor=#fefefe
| 231724 ||  || — || February 9, 1999 || Kitt Peak || Spacewatch || MAS || align=right data-sort-value="0.88" | 880 m || 
|-id=725 bgcolor=#fefefe
| 231725 ||  || — || February 8, 1999 || Kitt Peak || Spacewatch || NYS || align=right data-sort-value="0.77" | 770 m || 
|-id=726 bgcolor=#fefefe
| 231726 || 1999 EU || — || March 6, 1999 || Kitt Peak || Spacewatch || — || align=right data-sort-value="0.98" | 980 m || 
|-id=727 bgcolor=#fefefe
| 231727 ||  || — || March 6, 1999 || Kitt Peak || Spacewatch || V || align=right | 1.00 km || 
|-id=728 bgcolor=#fefefe
| 231728 ||  || — || March 15, 1999 || Socorro || LINEAR || — || align=right | 3.5 km || 
|-id=729 bgcolor=#d6d6d6
| 231729 ||  || — || March 14, 1999 || Kitt Peak || Spacewatch || EOS || align=right | 2.8 km || 
|-id=730 bgcolor=#fefefe
| 231730 ||  || — || March 18, 1999 || Kitt Peak || Spacewatch || MAS || align=right data-sort-value="0.93" | 930 m || 
|-id=731 bgcolor=#fefefe
| 231731 ||  || — || March 20, 1999 || Apache Point || SDSS || — || align=right | 2.5 km || 
|-id=732 bgcolor=#fefefe
| 231732 ||  || — || April 15, 1999 || Bergisch Gladbach || W. Bickel || V || align=right | 1.0 km || 
|-id=733 bgcolor=#fefefe
| 231733 ||  || — || April 6, 1999 || Kitt Peak || Spacewatch || NYS || align=right data-sort-value="0.97" | 970 m || 
|-id=734 bgcolor=#fefefe
| 231734 ||  || — || May 16, 1999 || Kitt Peak || Spacewatch || MAS || align=right data-sort-value="0.91" | 910 m || 
|-id=735 bgcolor=#d6d6d6
| 231735 ||  || — || June 12, 1999 || Socorro || LINEAR || — || align=right | 6.4 km || 
|-id=736 bgcolor=#d6d6d6
| 231736 || 1999 MD || — || June 16, 1999 || Kitt Peak || Spacewatch || HYG || align=right | 4.3 km || 
|-id=737 bgcolor=#E9E9E9
| 231737 ||  || — || July 12, 1999 || Socorro || LINEAR || — || align=right | 3.2 km || 
|-id=738 bgcolor=#E9E9E9
| 231738 ||  || — || September 7, 1999 || Socorro || LINEAR || — || align=right | 2.7 km || 
|-id=739 bgcolor=#E9E9E9
| 231739 ||  || — || September 8, 1999 || Socorro || LINEAR || — || align=right | 2.6 km || 
|-id=740 bgcolor=#E9E9E9
| 231740 ||  || — || September 8, 1999 || Socorro || LINEAR || — || align=right | 3.7 km || 
|-id=741 bgcolor=#E9E9E9
| 231741 ||  || — || September 9, 1999 || Socorro || LINEAR || — || align=right | 2.6 km || 
|-id=742 bgcolor=#E9E9E9
| 231742 ||  || — || September 9, 1999 || Socorro || LINEAR || — || align=right | 4.2 km || 
|-id=743 bgcolor=#E9E9E9
| 231743 ||  || — || September 9, 1999 || Socorro || LINEAR || — || align=right | 2.8 km || 
|-id=744 bgcolor=#E9E9E9
| 231744 ||  || — || September 8, 1999 || Socorro || LINEAR || — || align=right | 2.9 km || 
|-id=745 bgcolor=#d6d6d6
| 231745 ||  || — || September 15, 1999 || Kleť || Kleť Obs. || HIL3:2 || align=right | 7.6 km || 
|-id=746 bgcolor=#E9E9E9
| 231746 ||  || — || October 4, 1999 || Kitt Peak || Spacewatch || — || align=right | 1.8 km || 
|-id=747 bgcolor=#E9E9E9
| 231747 ||  || — || October 4, 1999 || Kitt Peak || Spacewatch || — || align=right | 2.0 km || 
|-id=748 bgcolor=#E9E9E9
| 231748 ||  || — || October 6, 1999 || Socorro || LINEAR || — || align=right data-sort-value="0.93" | 930 m || 
|-id=749 bgcolor=#d6d6d6
| 231749 ||  || — || October 7, 1999 || Socorro || LINEAR || Tj (2.96) || align=right | 6.8 km || 
|-id=750 bgcolor=#fefefe
| 231750 ||  || — || October 7, 1999 || Socorro || LINEAR || — || align=right data-sort-value="0.84" | 840 m || 
|-id=751 bgcolor=#E9E9E9
| 231751 ||  || — || October 10, 1999 || Socorro || LINEAR || — || align=right | 3.8 km || 
|-id=752 bgcolor=#E9E9E9
| 231752 ||  || — || October 10, 1999 || Socorro || LINEAR || — || align=right | 3.6 km || 
|-id=753 bgcolor=#fefefe
| 231753 ||  || — || October 12, 1999 || Socorro || LINEAR || NYS || align=right data-sort-value="0.72" | 720 m || 
|-id=754 bgcolor=#E9E9E9
| 231754 ||  || — || October 13, 1999 || Socorro || LINEAR || — || align=right | 3.7 km || 
|-id=755 bgcolor=#E9E9E9
| 231755 ||  || — || October 9, 1999 || Catalina || CSS || — || align=right | 3.2 km || 
|-id=756 bgcolor=#E9E9E9
| 231756 ||  || — || October 3, 1999 || Socorro || LINEAR || — || align=right | 3.3 km || 
|-id=757 bgcolor=#E9E9E9
| 231757 ||  || — || October 9, 1999 || Socorro || LINEAR || — || align=right | 3.1 km || 
|-id=758 bgcolor=#E9E9E9
| 231758 ||  || — || October 10, 1999 || Socorro || LINEAR || — || align=right | 3.6 km || 
|-id=759 bgcolor=#E9E9E9
| 231759 ||  || — || October 10, 1999 || Socorro || LINEAR || — || align=right | 4.3 km || 
|-id=760 bgcolor=#E9E9E9
| 231760 ||  || — || October 31, 1999 || Socorro || LINEAR || EUN || align=right | 2.0 km || 
|-id=761 bgcolor=#E9E9E9
| 231761 ||  || — || October 31, 1999 || Kitt Peak || Spacewatch || — || align=right | 2.0 km || 
|-id=762 bgcolor=#E9E9E9
| 231762 ||  || — || October 31, 1999 || Kitt Peak || Spacewatch || — || align=right | 1.6 km || 
|-id=763 bgcolor=#E9E9E9
| 231763 ||  || — || October 16, 1999 || Kitt Peak || Spacewatch || — || align=right | 2.6 km || 
|-id=764 bgcolor=#E9E9E9
| 231764 ||  || — || November 8, 1999 || Majorca || R. Pacheco, Á. López J. || DOR || align=right | 4.4 km || 
|-id=765 bgcolor=#E9E9E9
| 231765 ||  || — || November 3, 1999 || Catalina || CSS || — || align=right | 2.6 km || 
|-id=766 bgcolor=#fefefe
| 231766 ||  || — || November 4, 1999 || Kitt Peak || Spacewatch || — || align=right | 1.5 km || 
|-id=767 bgcolor=#E9E9E9
| 231767 ||  || — || November 9, 1999 || Socorro || LINEAR || — || align=right | 2.3 km || 
|-id=768 bgcolor=#d6d6d6
| 231768 ||  || — || November 9, 1999 || Kitt Peak || Spacewatch || KOR || align=right | 1.6 km || 
|-id=769 bgcolor=#E9E9E9
| 231769 ||  || — || November 14, 1999 || Socorro || LINEAR || — || align=right | 3.5 km || 
|-id=770 bgcolor=#E9E9E9
| 231770 ||  || — || November 9, 1999 || Kitt Peak || Spacewatch || AST || align=right | 3.0 km || 
|-id=771 bgcolor=#E9E9E9
| 231771 ||  || — || November 13, 1999 || Kitt Peak || Spacewatch || — || align=right | 3.2 km || 
|-id=772 bgcolor=#E9E9E9
| 231772 ||  || — || November 15, 1999 || Socorro || LINEAR || — || align=right | 3.1 km || 
|-id=773 bgcolor=#fefefe
| 231773 ||  || — || November 15, 1999 || Socorro || LINEAR || — || align=right | 2.1 km || 
|-id=774 bgcolor=#fefefe
| 231774 ||  || — || November 28, 1999 || Kitt Peak || Spacewatch || — || align=right data-sort-value="0.94" | 940 m || 
|-id=775 bgcolor=#E9E9E9
| 231775 ||  || — || December 5, 1999 || Catalina || CSS || CLO || align=right | 2.9 km || 
|-id=776 bgcolor=#fefefe
| 231776 ||  || — || December 10, 1999 || Eskridge || G. Hug, G. Bell || — || align=right | 1.2 km || 
|-id=777 bgcolor=#fefefe
| 231777 ||  || — || December 7, 1999 || Socorro || LINEAR || — || align=right | 1.1 km || 
|-id=778 bgcolor=#fefefe
| 231778 ||  || — || December 13, 1999 || Kitt Peak || Spacewatch || FLO || align=right data-sort-value="0.66" | 660 m || 
|-id=779 bgcolor=#fefefe
| 231779 ||  || — || January 3, 2000 || Kitt Peak || Spacewatch || PHO || align=right | 1.5 km || 
|-id=780 bgcolor=#d6d6d6
| 231780 ||  || — || January 29, 2000 || Kitt Peak || Spacewatch || KOR || align=right | 1.7 km || 
|-id=781 bgcolor=#E9E9E9
| 231781 ||  || — || February 2, 2000 || Socorro || LINEAR || — || align=right | 3.4 km || 
|-id=782 bgcolor=#E9E9E9
| 231782 ||  || — || February 2, 2000 || Socorro || LINEAR || — || align=right | 1.7 km || 
|-id=783 bgcolor=#d6d6d6
| 231783 ||  || — || February 2, 2000 || Socorro || LINEAR || — || align=right | 4.6 km || 
|-id=784 bgcolor=#d6d6d6
| 231784 ||  || — || February 2, 2000 || Socorro || LINEAR || — || align=right | 5.7 km || 
|-id=785 bgcolor=#fefefe
| 231785 ||  || — || February 4, 2000 || Socorro || LINEAR || FLO || align=right data-sort-value="0.98" | 980 m || 
|-id=786 bgcolor=#fefefe
| 231786 ||  || — || February 9, 2000 || Siding Spring || R. H. McNaught || — || align=right data-sort-value="0.90" | 900 m || 
|-id=787 bgcolor=#fefefe
| 231787 ||  || — || February 8, 2000 || Kitt Peak || Spacewatch || — || align=right | 1.0 km || 
|-id=788 bgcolor=#d6d6d6
| 231788 ||  || — || February 12, 2000 || Kitt Peak || Spacewatch || KAR || align=right | 1.4 km || 
|-id=789 bgcolor=#d6d6d6
| 231789 ||  || — || February 3, 2000 || Kitt Peak || Spacewatch || KOR || align=right | 1.8 km || 
|-id=790 bgcolor=#d6d6d6
| 231790 ||  || — || February 4, 2000 || Kitt Peak || Spacewatch || — || align=right | 2.8 km || 
|-id=791 bgcolor=#d6d6d6
| 231791 ||  || — || February 28, 2000 || Socorro || LINEAR || ITH || align=right | 4.8 km || 
|-id=792 bgcolor=#FFC2E0
| 231792 ||  || — || February 26, 2000 || Catalina || CSS || AMO || align=right data-sort-value="0.72" | 720 m || 
|-id=793 bgcolor=#d6d6d6
| 231793 ||  || — || February 26, 2000 || Kitt Peak || Spacewatch || NAE || align=right | 2.7 km || 
|-id=794 bgcolor=#fefefe
| 231794 ||  || — || February 28, 2000 || Kitt Peak || Spacewatch || FLO || align=right data-sort-value="0.92" | 920 m || 
|-id=795 bgcolor=#fefefe
| 231795 ||  || — || February 29, 2000 || Socorro || LINEAR || — || align=right data-sort-value="0.81" | 810 m || 
|-id=796 bgcolor=#fefefe
| 231796 ||  || — || February 29, 2000 || Socorro || LINEAR || — || align=right | 1.1 km || 
|-id=797 bgcolor=#fefefe
| 231797 ||  || — || February 27, 2000 || Kitt Peak || Spacewatch || PHO || align=right | 1.3 km || 
|-id=798 bgcolor=#fefefe
| 231798 ||  || — || March 3, 2000 || Socorro || LINEAR || — || align=right | 1.4 km || 
|-id=799 bgcolor=#d6d6d6
| 231799 ||  || — || March 3, 2000 || Socorro || LINEAR || — || align=right | 5.3 km || 
|-id=800 bgcolor=#E9E9E9
| 231800 ||  || — || March 5, 2000 || Socorro || LINEAR || HNA || align=right | 3.1 km || 
|}

231801–231900 

|-bgcolor=#FA8072
| 231801 ||  || — || March 6, 2000 || Višnjan Observatory || K. Korlević || — || align=right | 2.1 km || 
|-id=802 bgcolor=#fefefe
| 231802 ||  || — || March 3, 2000 || Kitt Peak || Spacewatch || — || align=right | 2.0 km || 
|-id=803 bgcolor=#d6d6d6
| 231803 ||  || — || March 12, 2000 || Socorro || LINEAR || — || align=right | 3.7 km || 
|-id=804 bgcolor=#d6d6d6
| 231804 ||  || — || March 11, 2000 || Anderson Mesa || LONEOS || — || align=right | 5.7 km || 
|-id=805 bgcolor=#d6d6d6
| 231805 ||  || — || March 10, 2000 || Kitt Peak || Spacewatch || — || align=right | 4.9 km || 
|-id=806 bgcolor=#d6d6d6
| 231806 ||  || — || March 11, 2000 || Anderson Mesa || LONEOS || — || align=right | 3.7 km || 
|-id=807 bgcolor=#d6d6d6
| 231807 ||  || — || March 4, 2000 || Socorro || LINEAR || — || align=right | 6.6 km || 
|-id=808 bgcolor=#d6d6d6
| 231808 ||  || — || March 4, 2000 || Socorro || LINEAR || — || align=right | 6.2 km || 
|-id=809 bgcolor=#d6d6d6
| 231809 ||  || — || March 29, 2000 || Socorro || LINEAR || — || align=right | 3.7 km || 
|-id=810 bgcolor=#fefefe
| 231810 ||  || — || March 27, 2000 || Anderson Mesa || LONEOS || — || align=right | 1.4 km || 
|-id=811 bgcolor=#d6d6d6
| 231811 ||  || — || April 5, 2000 || Socorro || LINEAR || EOS || align=right | 2.6 km || 
|-id=812 bgcolor=#d6d6d6
| 231812 ||  || — || April 5, 2000 || Socorro || LINEAR || — || align=right | 4.0 km || 
|-id=813 bgcolor=#d6d6d6
| 231813 ||  || — || April 5, 2000 || Socorro || LINEAR || — || align=right | 2.5 km || 
|-id=814 bgcolor=#d6d6d6
| 231814 ||  || — || April 5, 2000 || Socorro || LINEAR || — || align=right | 3.0 km || 
|-id=815 bgcolor=#fefefe
| 231815 ||  || — || April 3, 2000 || Kitt Peak || Spacewatch || — || align=right | 1.3 km || 
|-id=816 bgcolor=#d6d6d6
| 231816 ||  || — || April 7, 2000 || Kitt Peak || Spacewatch || THM || align=right | 3.3 km || 
|-id=817 bgcolor=#d6d6d6
| 231817 ||  || — || April 5, 2000 || Socorro || LINEAR || ALA || align=right | 4.7 km || 
|-id=818 bgcolor=#fefefe
| 231818 ||  || — || April 5, 2000 || Socorro || LINEAR || V || align=right data-sort-value="0.69" | 690 m || 
|-id=819 bgcolor=#d6d6d6
| 231819 ||  || — || April 28, 2000 || Anderson Mesa || LONEOS || — || align=right | 5.1 km || 
|-id=820 bgcolor=#fefefe
| 231820 ||  || — || April 28, 2000 || Anderson Mesa || LONEOS || V || align=right | 1.1 km || 
|-id=821 bgcolor=#fefefe
| 231821 ||  || — || April 28, 2000 || Anderson Mesa || LONEOS || PHO || align=right | 3.7 km || 
|-id=822 bgcolor=#d6d6d6
| 231822 ||  || — || April 27, 2000 || Anderson Mesa || LONEOS || — || align=right | 4.2 km || 
|-id=823 bgcolor=#d6d6d6
| 231823 ||  || — || May 3, 2000 || Socorro || LINEAR || URS || align=right | 5.9 km || 
|-id=824 bgcolor=#d6d6d6
| 231824 ||  || — || May 7, 2000 || Socorro || LINEAR || — || align=right | 3.6 km || 
|-id=825 bgcolor=#fefefe
| 231825 ||  || — || May 6, 2000 || Socorro || LINEAR || — || align=right | 1.4 km || 
|-id=826 bgcolor=#d6d6d6
| 231826 ||  || — || May 4, 2000 || Apache Point || SDSS || EOS || align=right | 3.0 km || 
|-id=827 bgcolor=#d6d6d6
| 231827 ||  || — || May 30, 2000 || Kitt Peak || Spacewatch || — || align=right | 3.4 km || 
|-id=828 bgcolor=#d6d6d6
| 231828 ||  || — || May 25, 2000 || Anderson Mesa || LONEOS || — || align=right | 5.9 km || 
|-id=829 bgcolor=#d6d6d6
| 231829 ||  || — || May 27, 2000 || Anderson Mesa || LONEOS || — || align=right | 4.4 km || 
|-id=830 bgcolor=#E9E9E9
| 231830 ||  || — || June 4, 2000 || Socorro || LINEAR || — || align=right | 2.4 km || 
|-id=831 bgcolor=#E9E9E9
| 231831 ||  || — || July 23, 2000 || Socorro || LINEAR || — || align=right | 3.1 km || 
|-id=832 bgcolor=#fefefe
| 231832 ||  || — || July 31, 2000 || Cerro Tololo || M. W. Buie || NYS || align=right data-sort-value="0.88" | 880 m || 
|-id=833 bgcolor=#d6d6d6
| 231833 ||  || — || August 3, 2000 || Kitt Peak || Spacewatch || — || align=right | 7.0 km || 
|-id=834 bgcolor=#fefefe
| 231834 ||  || — || August 24, 2000 || Socorro || LINEAR || H || align=right | 1.2 km || 
|-id=835 bgcolor=#E9E9E9
| 231835 ||  || — || August 24, 2000 || Socorro || LINEAR || — || align=right | 1.5 km || 
|-id=836 bgcolor=#fefefe
| 231836 ||  || — || August 24, 2000 || Socorro || LINEAR || — || align=right | 1.5 km || 
|-id=837 bgcolor=#E9E9E9
| 231837 ||  || — || August 29, 2000 || Socorro || LINEAR || — || align=right | 1.8 km || 
|-id=838 bgcolor=#E9E9E9
| 231838 ||  || — || August 31, 2000 || Socorro || LINEAR || — || align=right | 5.5 km || 
|-id=839 bgcolor=#fefefe
| 231839 ||  || — || August 31, 2000 || Socorro || LINEAR || — || align=right | 1.5 km || 
|-id=840 bgcolor=#E9E9E9
| 231840 ||  || — || August 31, 2000 || Goodricke-Pigott || R. A. Tucker || — || align=right | 3.6 km || 
|-id=841 bgcolor=#fefefe
| 231841 ||  || — || August 25, 2000 || Cerro Tololo || M. W. Buie || MAS || align=right data-sort-value="0.92" | 920 m || 
|-id=842 bgcolor=#fefefe
| 231842 ||  || — || August 27, 2000 || Cerro Tololo || M. W. Buie || — || align=right | 1.1 km || 
|-id=843 bgcolor=#fefefe
| 231843 ||  || — || September 2, 2000 || Socorro || LINEAR || — || align=right | 1.5 km || 
|-id=844 bgcolor=#d6d6d6
| 231844 ||  || — || September 3, 2000 || Socorro || LINEAR || ALA || align=right | 5.8 km || 
|-id=845 bgcolor=#E9E9E9
| 231845 ||  || — || September 1, 2000 || Socorro || LINEAR || — || align=right | 2.4 km || 
|-id=846 bgcolor=#fefefe
| 231846 ||  || — || September 2, 2000 || Anderson Mesa || LONEOS || — || align=right | 1.6 km || 
|-id=847 bgcolor=#E9E9E9
| 231847 ||  || — || September 2, 2000 || Anderson Mesa || LONEOS || — || align=right | 1.9 km || 
|-id=848 bgcolor=#E9E9E9
| 231848 ||  || — || September 24, 2000 || Socorro || LINEAR || — || align=right | 1.1 km || 
|-id=849 bgcolor=#d6d6d6
| 231849 ||  || — || September 24, 2000 || Socorro || LINEAR || THM || align=right | 5.6 km || 
|-id=850 bgcolor=#E9E9E9
| 231850 ||  || — || September 23, 2000 || Socorro || LINEAR || — || align=right | 1.9 km || 
|-id=851 bgcolor=#fefefe
| 231851 ||  || — || September 24, 2000 || Socorro || LINEAR || NYS || align=right | 1.0 km || 
|-id=852 bgcolor=#E9E9E9
| 231852 ||  || — || September 23, 2000 || Socorro || LINEAR || — || align=right | 2.2 km || 
|-id=853 bgcolor=#E9E9E9
| 231853 ||  || — || September 23, 2000 || Socorro || LINEAR || — || align=right | 1.9 km || 
|-id=854 bgcolor=#E9E9E9
| 231854 ||  || — || September 22, 2000 || Socorro || LINEAR || — || align=right | 1.8 km || 
|-id=855 bgcolor=#E9E9E9
| 231855 ||  || — || September 23, 2000 || Socorro || LINEAR || — || align=right | 2.0 km || 
|-id=856 bgcolor=#E9E9E9
| 231856 ||  || — || September 23, 2000 || Socorro || LINEAR || — || align=right | 1.6 km || 
|-id=857 bgcolor=#E9E9E9
| 231857 ||  || — || September 24, 2000 || Socorro || LINEAR || — || align=right | 2.9 km || 
|-id=858 bgcolor=#E9E9E9
| 231858 ||  || — || September 23, 2000 || Socorro || LINEAR || — || align=right | 3.1 km || 
|-id=859 bgcolor=#E9E9E9
| 231859 ||  || — || September 23, 2000 || Socorro || LINEAR || — || align=right | 2.1 km || 
|-id=860 bgcolor=#fefefe
| 231860 ||  || — || September 21, 2000 || Kitt Peak || Spacewatch || V || align=right data-sort-value="0.78" | 780 m || 
|-id=861 bgcolor=#fefefe
| 231861 ||  || — || September 24, 2000 || Socorro || LINEAR || — || align=right | 1.5 km || 
|-id=862 bgcolor=#E9E9E9
| 231862 ||  || — || September 24, 2000 || Socorro || LINEAR || — || align=right | 1.2 km || 
|-id=863 bgcolor=#E9E9E9
| 231863 ||  || — || September 24, 2000 || Socorro || LINEAR || — || align=right | 1.3 km || 
|-id=864 bgcolor=#E9E9E9
| 231864 ||  || — || September 28, 2000 || Socorro || LINEAR || — || align=right | 2.2 km || 
|-id=865 bgcolor=#E9E9E9
| 231865 ||  || — || September 26, 2000 || Socorro || LINEAR || — || align=right | 2.5 km || 
|-id=866 bgcolor=#E9E9E9
| 231866 ||  || — || September 26, 2000 || Socorro || LINEAR || MAR || align=right | 3.2 km || 
|-id=867 bgcolor=#E9E9E9
| 231867 ||  || — || September 27, 2000 || Socorro || LINEAR || JUN || align=right | 3.4 km || 
|-id=868 bgcolor=#fefefe
| 231868 ||  || — || September 29, 2000 || Anderson Mesa || LONEOS || CHL || align=right | 2.8 km || 
|-id=869 bgcolor=#E9E9E9
| 231869 ||  || — || September 20, 2000 || Socorro || LINEAR || — || align=right | 1.5 km || 
|-id=870 bgcolor=#d6d6d6
| 231870 ||  || — || September 21, 2000 || Anderson Mesa || LONEOS || ULA7:4 || align=right | 9.0 km || 
|-id=871 bgcolor=#E9E9E9
| 231871 ||  || — || October 1, 2000 || Socorro || LINEAR || — || align=right | 3.5 km || 
|-id=872 bgcolor=#d6d6d6
| 231872 ||  || — || October 2, 2000 || Socorro || LINEAR || 3:2 || align=right | 6.2 km || 
|-id=873 bgcolor=#E9E9E9
| 231873 ||  || — || October 1, 2000 || Socorro || LINEAR || — || align=right | 1.1 km || 
|-id=874 bgcolor=#E9E9E9
| 231874 ||  || — || October 24, 2000 || Socorro || LINEAR || — || align=right | 1.9 km || 
|-id=875 bgcolor=#E9E9E9
| 231875 ||  || — || October 24, 2000 || Socorro || LINEAR || — || align=right | 4.2 km || 
|-id=876 bgcolor=#E9E9E9
| 231876 ||  || — || October 24, 2000 || Socorro || LINEAR || — || align=right | 2.1 km || 
|-id=877 bgcolor=#E9E9E9
| 231877 ||  || — || October 25, 2000 || Socorro || LINEAR || — || align=right | 1.3 km || 
|-id=878 bgcolor=#E9E9E9
| 231878 ||  || — || October 24, 2000 || Socorro || LINEAR || — || align=right | 2.0 km || 
|-id=879 bgcolor=#fefefe
| 231879 ||  || — || October 25, 2000 || Socorro || LINEAR || V || align=right | 1.1 km || 
|-id=880 bgcolor=#E9E9E9
| 231880 ||  || — || October 21, 2000 || Kitt Peak || Spacewatch || — || align=right | 1.3 km || 
|-id=881 bgcolor=#E9E9E9
| 231881 ||  || — || October 25, 2000 || Socorro || LINEAR || — || align=right | 1.5 km || 
|-id=882 bgcolor=#E9E9E9
| 231882 || 2000 VO || — || November 1, 2000 || Kitt Peak || Spacewatch || — || align=right | 1.2 km || 
|-id=883 bgcolor=#E9E9E9
| 231883 ||  || — || November 2, 2000 || Ondřejov || P. Kušnirák, P. Pravec || — || align=right | 1.3 km || 
|-id=884 bgcolor=#E9E9E9
| 231884 ||  || — || November 1, 2000 || Socorro || LINEAR || — || align=right | 2.1 km || 
|-id=885 bgcolor=#fefefe
| 231885 ||  || — || November 1, 2000 || Socorro || LINEAR || V || align=right | 1.3 km || 
|-id=886 bgcolor=#E9E9E9
| 231886 ||  || — || November 1, 2000 || Socorro || LINEAR || — || align=right | 1.7 km || 
|-id=887 bgcolor=#E9E9E9
| 231887 ||  || — || November 2, 2000 || Socorro || LINEAR || — || align=right | 2.1 km || 
|-id=888 bgcolor=#E9E9E9
| 231888 ||  || — || November 3, 2000 || Socorro || LINEAR || — || align=right | 2.1 km || 
|-id=889 bgcolor=#E9E9E9
| 231889 ||  || — || November 20, 2000 || Socorro || LINEAR || — || align=right | 2.5 km || 
|-id=890 bgcolor=#E9E9E9
| 231890 ||  || — || November 20, 2000 || Socorro || LINEAR || JUN || align=right | 1.6 km || 
|-id=891 bgcolor=#E9E9E9
| 231891 ||  || — || November 21, 2000 || Socorro || LINEAR || — || align=right | 1.4 km || 
|-id=892 bgcolor=#E9E9E9
| 231892 ||  || — || November 19, 2000 || Socorro || LINEAR || — || align=right | 1.9 km || 
|-id=893 bgcolor=#E9E9E9
| 231893 ||  || — || November 20, 2000 || Socorro || LINEAR || ADE || align=right | 4.6 km || 
|-id=894 bgcolor=#E9E9E9
| 231894 ||  || — || November 20, 2000 || Socorro || LINEAR || — || align=right | 3.3 km || 
|-id=895 bgcolor=#E9E9E9
| 231895 ||  || — || November 20, 2000 || Socorro || LINEAR || — || align=right | 2.4 km || 
|-id=896 bgcolor=#E9E9E9
| 231896 ||  || — || November 20, 2000 || Socorro || LINEAR || — || align=right | 3.4 km || 
|-id=897 bgcolor=#E9E9E9
| 231897 ||  || — || November 21, 2000 || Socorro || LINEAR || DOR || align=right | 3.5 km || 
|-id=898 bgcolor=#E9E9E9
| 231898 ||  || — || November 28, 2000 || Kitt Peak || Spacewatch || — || align=right | 2.0 km || 
|-id=899 bgcolor=#E9E9E9
| 231899 ||  || — || November 30, 2000 || Socorro || LINEAR || — || align=right | 2.0 km || 
|-id=900 bgcolor=#d6d6d6
| 231900 ||  || — || November 29, 2000 || Anderson Mesa || LONEOS || THB || align=right | 5.0 km || 
|}

231901–232000 

|-bgcolor=#E9E9E9
| 231901 ||  || — || December 4, 2000 || Socorro || LINEAR || ADE || align=right | 4.3 km || 
|-id=902 bgcolor=#E9E9E9
| 231902 ||  || — || December 4, 2000 || Socorro || LINEAR || MAR || align=right | 2.1 km || 
|-id=903 bgcolor=#E9E9E9
| 231903 ||  || — || December 4, 2000 || Socorro || LINEAR || — || align=right | 3.9 km || 
|-id=904 bgcolor=#E9E9E9
| 231904 ||  || — || December 6, 2000 || Socorro || LINEAR || MIT || align=right | 3.8 km || 
|-id=905 bgcolor=#fefefe
| 231905 || 2000 YL || — || December 16, 2000 || Socorro || LINEAR || — || align=right | 4.2 km || 
|-id=906 bgcolor=#E9E9E9
| 231906 ||  || — || December 22, 2000 || Kitt Peak || Spacewatch || — || align=right | 1.4 km || 
|-id=907 bgcolor=#E9E9E9
| 231907 ||  || — || December 30, 2000 || Socorro || LINEAR || — || align=right | 2.8 km || 
|-id=908 bgcolor=#E9E9E9
| 231908 ||  || — || December 30, 2000 || Socorro || LINEAR || — || align=right | 4.5 km || 
|-id=909 bgcolor=#d6d6d6
| 231909 ||  || — || December 30, 2000 || Socorro || LINEAR || 3:2 || align=right | 6.5 km || 
|-id=910 bgcolor=#E9E9E9
| 231910 ||  || — || December 30, 2000 || Socorro || LINEAR || — || align=right | 4.1 km || 
|-id=911 bgcolor=#E9E9E9
| 231911 ||  || — || December 30, 2000 || Socorro || LINEAR || ADE || align=right | 4.3 km || 
|-id=912 bgcolor=#E9E9E9
| 231912 ||  || — || December 30, 2000 || Socorro || LINEAR || — || align=right | 2.2 km || 
|-id=913 bgcolor=#d6d6d6
| 231913 ||  || — || December 26, 2000 || Haleakala || NEAT || Tj (2.92) || align=right | 6.1 km || 
|-id=914 bgcolor=#E9E9E9
| 231914 ||  || — || December 19, 2000 || Kitt Peak || DLS || — || align=right | 2.5 km || 
|-id=915 bgcolor=#E9E9E9
| 231915 || 2001 AJ || — || January 1, 2001 || Kitt Peak || Spacewatch || — || align=right | 2.6 km || 
|-id=916 bgcolor=#E9E9E9
| 231916 ||  || — || January 15, 2001 || Socorro || LINEAR || JUN || align=right | 1.6 km || 
|-id=917 bgcolor=#E9E9E9
| 231917 ||  || — || January 20, 2001 || Socorro || LINEAR || — || align=right | 3.7 km || 
|-id=918 bgcolor=#E9E9E9
| 231918 ||  || — || January 19, 2001 || Socorro || LINEAR || — || align=right | 2.6 km || 
|-id=919 bgcolor=#E9E9E9
| 231919 ||  || — || January 26, 2001 || Socorro || LINEAR || — || align=right | 2.1 km || 
|-id=920 bgcolor=#E9E9E9
| 231920 ||  || — || January 23, 2001 || Kitt Peak || Spacewatch || — || align=right | 2.9 km || 
|-id=921 bgcolor=#E9E9E9
| 231921 ||  || — || February 1, 2001 || Socorro || LINEAR || ADE || align=right | 4.5 km || 
|-id=922 bgcolor=#E9E9E9
| 231922 ||  || — || February 1, 2001 || Socorro || LINEAR || — || align=right | 3.3 km || 
|-id=923 bgcolor=#E9E9E9
| 231923 ||  || — || February 13, 2001 || Socorro || LINEAR || — || align=right | 4.2 km || 
|-id=924 bgcolor=#E9E9E9
| 231924 ||  || — || February 15, 2001 || Kleť || Kleť Obs. || — || align=right | 3.7 km || 
|-id=925 bgcolor=#E9E9E9
| 231925 ||  || — || February 13, 2001 || Socorro || LINEAR || — || align=right | 4.3 km || 
|-id=926 bgcolor=#E9E9E9
| 231926 ||  || — || February 1, 2001 || Socorro || LINEAR || GAL || align=right | 2.3 km || 
|-id=927 bgcolor=#E9E9E9
| 231927 ||  || — || February 17, 2001 || Socorro || LINEAR || CLO || align=right | 4.3 km || 
|-id=928 bgcolor=#E9E9E9
| 231928 ||  || — || February 19, 2001 || Socorro || LINEAR || — || align=right | 2.7 km || 
|-id=929 bgcolor=#E9E9E9
| 231929 ||  || — || February 19, 2001 || Socorro || LINEAR || MIS || align=right | 3.3 km || 
|-id=930 bgcolor=#E9E9E9
| 231930 ||  || — || February 19, 2001 || Socorro || LINEAR || — || align=right | 3.6 km || 
|-id=931 bgcolor=#E9E9E9
| 231931 ||  || — || February 20, 2001 || Socorro || LINEAR || — || align=right | 3.1 km || 
|-id=932 bgcolor=#E9E9E9
| 231932 ||  || — || February 20, 2001 || Socorro || LINEAR || — || align=right | 3.5 km || 
|-id=933 bgcolor=#E9E9E9
| 231933 ||  || — || February 16, 2001 || Kitt Peak || Spacewatch || — || align=right | 2.9 km || 
|-id=934 bgcolor=#E9E9E9
| 231934 ||  || — || March 2, 2001 || Haleakala || NEAT || — || align=right | 1.8 km || 
|-id=935 bgcolor=#E9E9E9
| 231935 || 2001 FO || — || March 16, 2001 || Socorro || LINEAR || — || align=right | 2.0 km || 
|-id=936 bgcolor=#d6d6d6
| 231936 ||  || — || March 19, 2001 || Kitt Peak || Spacewatch || — || align=right | 2.9 km || 
|-id=937 bgcolor=#FFC2E0
| 231937 ||  || — || March 23, 2001 || Socorro || LINEAR || APO +1kmPHA || align=right | 1.1 km || 
|-id=938 bgcolor=#E9E9E9
| 231938 ||  || — || March 18, 2001 || Anderson Mesa || LONEOS || DOR || align=right | 3.5 km || 
|-id=939 bgcolor=#E9E9E9
| 231939 ||  || — || March 30, 2001 || Socorro || LINEAR || — || align=right | 2.3 km || 
|-id=940 bgcolor=#d6d6d6
| 231940 ||  || — || March 23, 2001 || Anderson Mesa || LONEOS || KOR || align=right | 2.4 km || 
|-id=941 bgcolor=#E9E9E9
| 231941 ||  || — || March 23, 2001 || Anderson Mesa || LONEOS || — || align=right | 3.1 km || 
|-id=942 bgcolor=#E9E9E9
| 231942 ||  || — || March 24, 2001 || Anderson Mesa || LONEOS || JUN || align=right | 1.9 km || 
|-id=943 bgcolor=#E9E9E9
| 231943 ||  || — || March 24, 2001 || Haleakala || NEAT || — || align=right | 2.0 km || 
|-id=944 bgcolor=#fefefe
| 231944 ||  || — || April 16, 2001 || Anderson Mesa || LONEOS || FLO || align=right data-sort-value="0.89" | 890 m || 
|-id=945 bgcolor=#E9E9E9
| 231945 ||  || — || April 25, 2001 || Anderson Mesa || LONEOS || — || align=right | 2.4 km || 
|-id=946 bgcolor=#E9E9E9
| 231946 ||  || — || May 18, 2001 || Goodricke-Pigott || R. A. Tucker || — || align=right | 2.4 km || 
|-id=947 bgcolor=#E9E9E9
| 231947 ||  || — || May 22, 2001 || Socorro || LINEAR || — || align=right | 4.5 km || 
|-id=948 bgcolor=#d6d6d6
| 231948 ||  || — || May 22, 2001 || Anderson Mesa || LONEOS || — || align=right | 3.6 km || 
|-id=949 bgcolor=#d6d6d6
| 231949 ||  || — || July 13, 2001 || Palomar || NEAT || — || align=right | 5.0 km || 
|-id=950 bgcolor=#d6d6d6
| 231950 ||  || — || July 13, 2001 || Palomar || NEAT || EMA || align=right | 7.0 km || 
|-id=951 bgcolor=#d6d6d6
| 231951 ||  || — || July 17, 2001 || Anderson Mesa || LONEOS || LIX || align=right | 6.1 km || 
|-id=952 bgcolor=#fefefe
| 231952 ||  || — || July 18, 2001 || Palomar || NEAT || — || align=right | 1.2 km || 
|-id=953 bgcolor=#d6d6d6
| 231953 ||  || — || July 18, 2001 || Haleakala || NEAT || — || align=right | 4.6 km || 
|-id=954 bgcolor=#fefefe
| 231954 ||  || — || July 22, 2001 || Palomar || NEAT || — || align=right | 1.2 km || 
|-id=955 bgcolor=#d6d6d6
| 231955 ||  || — || July 21, 2001 || Palomar || NEAT || EOS || align=right | 3.0 km || 
|-id=956 bgcolor=#fefefe
| 231956 ||  || — || July 20, 2001 || Palomar || NEAT || — || align=right | 2.9 km || 
|-id=957 bgcolor=#d6d6d6
| 231957 ||  || — || July 29, 2001 || Palomar || NEAT || — || align=right | 6.5 km || 
|-id=958 bgcolor=#d6d6d6
| 231958 ||  || — || August 14, 2001 || Haleakala || NEAT || AEG || align=right | 6.2 km || 
|-id=959 bgcolor=#fefefe
| 231959 ||  || — || August 14, 2001 || Haleakala || NEAT || — || align=right | 1.2 km || 
|-id=960 bgcolor=#fefefe
| 231960 ||  || — || August 16, 2001 || Socorro || LINEAR || — || align=right | 1.2 km || 
|-id=961 bgcolor=#fefefe
| 231961 ||  || — || August 16, 2001 || Socorro || LINEAR || — || align=right | 1.1 km || 
|-id=962 bgcolor=#d6d6d6
| 231962 ||  || — || August 16, 2001 || Socorro || LINEAR || — || align=right | 5.1 km || 
|-id=963 bgcolor=#fefefe
| 231963 ||  || — || August 16, 2001 || Socorro || LINEAR || — || align=right | 1.3 km || 
|-id=964 bgcolor=#fefefe
| 231964 ||  || — || August 16, 2001 || Socorro || LINEAR || NYS || align=right | 2.6 km || 
|-id=965 bgcolor=#fefefe
| 231965 ||  || — || August 16, 2001 || Socorro || LINEAR || — || align=right | 1.0 km || 
|-id=966 bgcolor=#fefefe
| 231966 ||  || — || August 16, 2001 || Socorro || LINEAR || — || align=right data-sort-value="0.94" | 940 m || 
|-id=967 bgcolor=#d6d6d6
| 231967 ||  || — || August 16, 2001 || Socorro || LINEAR || — || align=right | 4.9 km || 
|-id=968 bgcolor=#d6d6d6
| 231968 ||  || — || August 17, 2001 || Socorro || LINEAR || THB || align=right | 5.2 km || 
|-id=969 bgcolor=#d6d6d6
| 231969 Sebvauclair ||  ||  || August 24, 2001 || Pic du Midi || Pic du Midi Obs. || URS || align=right | 4.9 km || 
|-id=970 bgcolor=#d6d6d6
| 231970 ||  || — || August 17, 2001 || La Palma || R. Greimel || — || align=right | 7.5 km || 
|-id=971 bgcolor=#fefefe
| 231971 ||  || — || August 23, 2001 || Anderson Mesa || LONEOS || NYS || align=right data-sort-value="0.88" | 880 m || 
|-id=972 bgcolor=#d6d6d6
| 231972 ||  || — || August 17, 2001 || Needville || Needville Obs. || — || align=right | 3.8 km || 
|-id=973 bgcolor=#d6d6d6
| 231973 ||  || — || August 17, 2001 || Socorro || LINEAR || URS || align=right | 6.9 km || 
|-id=974 bgcolor=#d6d6d6
| 231974 ||  || — || August 19, 2001 || Socorro || LINEAR || — || align=right | 5.3 km || 
|-id=975 bgcolor=#fefefe
| 231975 ||  || — || August 20, 2001 || Socorro || LINEAR || — || align=right | 1.0 km || 
|-id=976 bgcolor=#d6d6d6
| 231976 ||  || — || August 20, 2001 || Socorro || LINEAR || — || align=right | 6.0 km || 
|-id=977 bgcolor=#d6d6d6
| 231977 ||  || — || August 23, 2001 || Anderson Mesa || LONEOS || — || align=right | 3.5 km || 
|-id=978 bgcolor=#d6d6d6
| 231978 ||  || — || August 25, 2001 || Socorro || LINEAR || AEG || align=right | 5.8 km || 
|-id=979 bgcolor=#fefefe
| 231979 ||  || — || August 22, 2001 || Palomar || NEAT || H || align=right data-sort-value="0.92" | 920 m || 
|-id=980 bgcolor=#fefefe
| 231980 ||  || — || August 23, 2001 || Anderson Mesa || LONEOS || — || align=right | 1.3 km || 
|-id=981 bgcolor=#FA8072
| 231981 ||  || — || August 23, 2001 || Socorro || LINEAR || H || align=right data-sort-value="0.94" | 940 m || 
|-id=982 bgcolor=#fefefe
| 231982 ||  || — || August 24, 2001 || Socorro || LINEAR || NYS || align=right | 1.2 km || 
|-id=983 bgcolor=#fefefe
| 231983 ||  || — || August 24, 2001 || Socorro || LINEAR || — || align=right | 1.3 km || 
|-id=984 bgcolor=#fefefe
| 231984 ||  || — || August 28, 2001 || Anderson Mesa || LONEOS || V || align=right data-sort-value="0.99" | 990 m || 
|-id=985 bgcolor=#fefefe
| 231985 ||  || — || August 27, 2001 || Palomar || NEAT || — || align=right | 1.3 km || 
|-id=986 bgcolor=#d6d6d6
| 231986 ||  || — || September 10, 2001 || Socorro || LINEAR || EUP || align=right | 5.5 km || 
|-id=987 bgcolor=#fefefe
| 231987 ||  || — || September 7, 2001 || Socorro || LINEAR || — || align=right data-sort-value="0.95" | 950 m || 
|-id=988 bgcolor=#d6d6d6
| 231988 ||  || — || September 7, 2001 || Socorro || LINEAR || — || align=right | 3.8 km || 
|-id=989 bgcolor=#fefefe
| 231989 ||  || — || September 8, 2001 || Socorro || LINEAR || — || align=right | 1.2 km || 
|-id=990 bgcolor=#fefefe
| 231990 ||  || — || September 10, 2001 || Socorro || LINEAR || NYS || align=right | 1.3 km || 
|-id=991 bgcolor=#fefefe
| 231991 ||  || — || September 12, 2001 || Socorro || LINEAR || — || align=right | 1.7 km || 
|-id=992 bgcolor=#fefefe
| 231992 ||  || — || September 12, 2001 || Socorro || LINEAR || FLO || align=right data-sort-value="0.77" | 770 m || 
|-id=993 bgcolor=#d6d6d6
| 231993 ||  || — || September 12, 2001 || Socorro || LINEAR || — || align=right | 4.6 km || 
|-id=994 bgcolor=#d6d6d6
| 231994 ||  || — || September 12, 2001 || Socorro || LINEAR || THM || align=right | 3.6 km || 
|-id=995 bgcolor=#fefefe
| 231995 ||  || — || September 11, 2001 || Anderson Mesa || LONEOS || — || align=right | 1.2 km || 
|-id=996 bgcolor=#fefefe
| 231996 ||  || — || September 17, 2001 || Desert Eagle || W. K. Y. Yeung || — || align=right | 1.6 km || 
|-id=997 bgcolor=#fefefe
| 231997 ||  || — || September 16, 2001 || Socorro || LINEAR || — || align=right | 1.2 km || 
|-id=998 bgcolor=#fefefe
| 231998 ||  || — || September 16, 2001 || Socorro || LINEAR || — || align=right | 1.1 km || 
|-id=999 bgcolor=#fefefe
| 231999 ||  || — || September 16, 2001 || Socorro || LINEAR || — || align=right | 1.1 km || 
|-id=000 bgcolor=#fefefe
| 232000 ||  || — || September 17, 2001 || Socorro || LINEAR || — || align=right | 1.7 km || 
|}

References

External links 
 Discovery Circumstances: Numbered Minor Planets (230001)–(235000) (IAU Minor Planet Center)

0231